

395001–395100 

|-bgcolor=#E9E9E9
| 395001 ||  || — || January 30, 2009 || Mount Lemmon || Mount Lemmon Survey || — || align=right | 1.5 km || 
|-id=002 bgcolor=#E9E9E9
| 395002 ||  || — || January 29, 2009 || Kitt Peak || Spacewatch || — || align=right | 1.9 km || 
|-id=003 bgcolor=#E9E9E9
| 395003 ||  || — || January 30, 2009 || Mount Lemmon || Mount Lemmon Survey || — || align=right | 1.2 km || 
|-id=004 bgcolor=#E9E9E9
| 395004 ||  || — || December 22, 2008 || Kitt Peak || Spacewatch || — || align=right | 1.7 km || 
|-id=005 bgcolor=#E9E9E9
| 395005 ||  || — || January 29, 2009 || Kitt Peak || Spacewatch || EUN || align=right | 1.4 km || 
|-id=006 bgcolor=#E9E9E9
| 395006 ||  || — || January 29, 2009 || Kitt Peak || Spacewatch || — || align=right | 1.5 km || 
|-id=007 bgcolor=#E9E9E9
| 395007 ||  || — || November 7, 2007 || Mount Lemmon || Mount Lemmon Survey || — || align=right | 1.3 km || 
|-id=008 bgcolor=#E9E9E9
| 395008 ||  || — || January 30, 2009 || Kitt Peak || Spacewatch || — || align=right | 1.2 km || 
|-id=009 bgcolor=#E9E9E9
| 395009 ||  || — || January 1, 2009 || Kitt Peak || Spacewatch || WIT || align=right | 1.1 km || 
|-id=010 bgcolor=#E9E9E9
| 395010 ||  || — || January 31, 2009 || Kitt Peak || Spacewatch || — || align=right | 1.0 km || 
|-id=011 bgcolor=#E9E9E9
| 395011 ||  || — || January 31, 2009 || Kitt Peak || Spacewatch || — || align=right | 2.1 km || 
|-id=012 bgcolor=#E9E9E9
| 395012 ||  || — || January 25, 2009 || Kitt Peak || Spacewatch || — || align=right | 1.3 km || 
|-id=013 bgcolor=#E9E9E9
| 395013 ||  || — || January 25, 2009 || Kitt Peak || Spacewatch || — || align=right | 1.4 km || 
|-id=014 bgcolor=#E9E9E9
| 395014 ||  || — || December 12, 2004 || Kitt Peak || Spacewatch || — || align=right | 2.4 km || 
|-id=015 bgcolor=#E9E9E9
| 395015 ||  || — || December 27, 2003 || Socorro || LINEAR || — || align=right | 3.0 km || 
|-id=016 bgcolor=#E9E9E9
| 395016 ||  || — || January 25, 2009 || Kitt Peak || Spacewatch || — || align=right | 1.1 km || 
|-id=017 bgcolor=#E9E9E9
| 395017 ||  || — || January 16, 2009 || Kitt Peak || Spacewatch || EUN || align=right | 1.6 km || 
|-id=018 bgcolor=#E9E9E9
| 395018 ||  || — || February 2, 2009 || Mayhill || E. Guido || — || align=right | 1.6 km || 
|-id=019 bgcolor=#E9E9E9
| 395019 ||  || — || February 2, 2009 || Moletai || K. Černis, J. Zdanavičius || AEO || align=right | 1.1 km || 
|-id=020 bgcolor=#E9E9E9
| 395020 ||  || — || February 1, 2009 || Mount Lemmon || Mount Lemmon Survey || — || align=right | 2.4 km || 
|-id=021 bgcolor=#E9E9E9
| 395021 ||  || — || February 1, 2009 || Kitt Peak || Spacewatch || — || align=right | 2.2 km || 
|-id=022 bgcolor=#E9E9E9
| 395022 ||  || — || February 1, 2009 || Kitt Peak || Spacewatch || — || align=right | 1.6 km || 
|-id=023 bgcolor=#E9E9E9
| 395023 ||  || — || February 1, 2009 || Kitt Peak || Spacewatch || — || align=right | 2.3 km || 
|-id=024 bgcolor=#E9E9E9
| 395024 ||  || — || February 4, 2009 || Mount Lemmon || Mount Lemmon Survey || — || align=right | 1.3 km || 
|-id=025 bgcolor=#E9E9E9
| 395025 ||  || — || February 13, 2009 || Kitt Peak || Spacewatch || — || align=right | 1.4 km || 
|-id=026 bgcolor=#E9E9E9
| 395026 ||  || — || January 16, 2009 || Kitt Peak || Spacewatch || — || align=right | 1.5 km || 
|-id=027 bgcolor=#E9E9E9
| 395027 ||  || — || February 14, 2009 || Kitt Peak || Spacewatch || — || align=right | 1.4 km || 
|-id=028 bgcolor=#E9E9E9
| 395028 ||  || — || February 14, 2009 || La Sagra || OAM Obs. || — || align=right | 2.6 km || 
|-id=029 bgcolor=#E9E9E9
| 395029 ||  || — || February 17, 2009 || La Sagra || OAM Obs. || — || align=right | 1.8 km || 
|-id=030 bgcolor=#E9E9E9
| 395030 ||  || — || February 5, 2009 || Kitt Peak || Spacewatch || — || align=right data-sort-value="0.87" | 870 m || 
|-id=031 bgcolor=#E9E9E9
| 395031 ||  || — || February 21, 2009 || Mount Lemmon || Mount Lemmon Survey || — || align=right | 2.0 km || 
|-id=032 bgcolor=#E9E9E9
| 395032 ||  || — || January 20, 2009 || Mount Lemmon || Mount Lemmon Survey || — || align=right | 2.5 km || 
|-id=033 bgcolor=#E9E9E9
| 395033 ||  || — || January 20, 2009 || Kitt Peak || Spacewatch || — || align=right | 1.2 km || 
|-id=034 bgcolor=#E9E9E9
| 395034 ||  || — || February 22, 2009 || Kitt Peak || Spacewatch || — || align=right | 2.0 km || 
|-id=035 bgcolor=#E9E9E9
| 395035 ||  || — || February 13, 2009 || Kitt Peak || Spacewatch || — || align=right | 2.9 km || 
|-id=036 bgcolor=#E9E9E9
| 395036 ||  || — || February 22, 2009 || Kitt Peak || Spacewatch || — || align=right | 2.3 km || 
|-id=037 bgcolor=#E9E9E9
| 395037 ||  || — || January 19, 2004 || Kitt Peak || Spacewatch || AGN || align=right | 1.1 km || 
|-id=038 bgcolor=#E9E9E9
| 395038 ||  || — || February 27, 2009 || Kitt Peak || Spacewatch || — || align=right | 2.1 km || 
|-id=039 bgcolor=#E9E9E9
| 395039 ||  || — || February 27, 2009 || Kitt Peak || Spacewatch || — || align=right | 1.9 km || 
|-id=040 bgcolor=#E9E9E9
| 395040 ||  || — || February 28, 2009 || Kitt Peak || Spacewatch || MRX || align=right data-sort-value="0.94" | 940 m || 
|-id=041 bgcolor=#E9E9E9
| 395041 ||  || — || February 26, 2009 || Kitt Peak || Spacewatch ||  || align=right | 1.9 km || 
|-id=042 bgcolor=#E9E9E9
| 395042 ||  || — || February 26, 2009 || Kitt Peak || Spacewatch || — || align=right | 2.5 km || 
|-id=043 bgcolor=#d6d6d6
| 395043 ||  || — || September 23, 2006 || Kitt Peak || Spacewatch || fast || align=right | 2.4 km || 
|-id=044 bgcolor=#E9E9E9
| 395044 ||  || — || February 24, 2009 || Mount Lemmon || Mount Lemmon Survey || — || align=right | 2.4 km || 
|-id=045 bgcolor=#d6d6d6
| 395045 ||  || — || February 5, 2009 || Mount Lemmon || Mount Lemmon Survey || — || align=right | 2.7 km || 
|-id=046 bgcolor=#E9E9E9
| 395046 ||  || — || February 26, 2009 || Calar Alto || F. Hormuth || — || align=right data-sort-value="0.96" | 960 m || 
|-id=047 bgcolor=#E9E9E9
| 395047 ||  || — || February 27, 2009 || Kitt Peak || Spacewatch || — || align=right | 2.1 km || 
|-id=048 bgcolor=#E9E9E9
| 395048 ||  || — || February 27, 2009 || Kitt Peak || Spacewatch || HNS || align=right | 1.0 km || 
|-id=049 bgcolor=#d6d6d6
| 395049 ||  || — || February 20, 2009 || Mount Lemmon || Mount Lemmon Survey || — || align=right | 2.5 km || 
|-id=050 bgcolor=#d6d6d6
| 395050 ||  || — || February 27, 2009 || Kitt Peak || Spacewatch || KOR || align=right | 1.2 km || 
|-id=051 bgcolor=#E9E9E9
| 395051 ||  || — || February 19, 2009 || Kitt Peak || Spacewatch || WIT || align=right data-sort-value="0.92" | 920 m || 
|-id=052 bgcolor=#E9E9E9
| 395052 ||  || — || March 2, 2009 || Socorro || LINEAR || — || align=right | 2.4 km || 
|-id=053 bgcolor=#E9E9E9
| 395053 ||  || — || March 15, 2009 || Kitt Peak || Spacewatch || — || align=right | 2.0 km || 
|-id=054 bgcolor=#d6d6d6
| 395054 ||  || — || March 15, 2009 || Kitt Peak || Spacewatch || — || align=right | 2.3 km || 
|-id=055 bgcolor=#E9E9E9
| 395055 ||  || — || March 3, 2009 || Mount Lemmon || Mount Lemmon Survey ||  || align=right | 1.9 km || 
|-id=056 bgcolor=#E9E9E9
| 395056 ||  || — || March 1, 2009 || Kitt Peak || Spacewatch || DOR || align=right | 2.7 km || 
|-id=057 bgcolor=#E9E9E9
| 395057 ||  || — || March 17, 2009 || Wildberg || R. Apitzsch || fast? || align=right | 1.8 km || 
|-id=058 bgcolor=#E9E9E9
| 395058 ||  || — || February 28, 2009 || Mount Lemmon || Mount Lemmon Survey || PAD || align=right | 2.0 km || 
|-id=059 bgcolor=#E9E9E9
| 395059 ||  || — || March 16, 2009 || Kitt Peak || Spacewatch || — || align=right | 1.8 km || 
|-id=060 bgcolor=#E9E9E9
| 395060 ||  || — || March 17, 2009 || Kitt Peak || Spacewatch || HOF || align=right | 2.4 km || 
|-id=061 bgcolor=#E9E9E9
| 395061 ||  || — || March 21, 2009 || Kitt Peak || Spacewatch || AGN || align=right | 1.4 km || 
|-id=062 bgcolor=#E9E9E9
| 395062 ||  || — || March 16, 2009 || Mount Lemmon || Mount Lemmon Survey || — || align=right | 1.9 km || 
|-id=063 bgcolor=#E9E9E9
| 395063 ||  || — || March 21, 2009 || Kitt Peak || Spacewatch || — || align=right | 2.3 km || 
|-id=064 bgcolor=#E9E9E9
| 395064 ||  || — || March 1, 2009 || Kitt Peak || Spacewatch || — || align=right | 2.4 km || 
|-id=065 bgcolor=#d6d6d6
| 395065 ||  || — || March 17, 2009 || Kitt Peak || Spacewatch || — || align=right | 2.5 km || 
|-id=066 bgcolor=#E9E9E9
| 395066 ||  || — || March 22, 2009 || Mount Lemmon || Mount Lemmon Survey || — || align=right | 2.2 km || 
|-id=067 bgcolor=#E9E9E9
| 395067 ||  || — || March 29, 2009 || Kitt Peak || Spacewatch || — || align=right | 2.3 km || 
|-id=068 bgcolor=#d6d6d6
| 395068 ||  || — || March 21, 2009 || La Sagra || OAM Obs. || — || align=right | 2.7 km || 
|-id=069 bgcolor=#d6d6d6
| 395069 ||  || — || April 3, 2009 || Cerro Burek || Alianza S4 Obs. || — || align=right | 3.5 km || 
|-id=070 bgcolor=#d6d6d6
| 395070 ||  || — || April 3, 2009 || Cerro Burek || Alianza S4 Obs. || — || align=right | 3.1 km || 
|-id=071 bgcolor=#d6d6d6
| 395071 ||  || — || April 2, 2009 || Kitt Peak || Spacewatch || — || align=right | 2.5 km || 
|-id=072 bgcolor=#d6d6d6
| 395072 ||  || — || November 25, 2005 || Catalina || CSS || — || align=right | 3.3 km || 
|-id=073 bgcolor=#d6d6d6
| 395073 ||  || — || March 29, 2009 || Kitt Peak || Spacewatch || — || align=right | 2.7 km || 
|-id=074 bgcolor=#d6d6d6
| 395074 ||  || — || April 17, 2009 || Kitt Peak || Spacewatch || — || align=right | 3.0 km || 
|-id=075 bgcolor=#d6d6d6
| 395075 ||  || — || April 17, 2009 || Kitt Peak || Spacewatch || — || align=right | 2.6 km || 
|-id=076 bgcolor=#d6d6d6
| 395076 ||  || — || April 19, 2009 || Kitt Peak || Spacewatch || — || align=right | 2.7 km || 
|-id=077 bgcolor=#d6d6d6
| 395077 ||  || — || April 19, 2009 || Mount Lemmon || Mount Lemmon Survey || — || align=right | 2.3 km || 
|-id=078 bgcolor=#FA8072
| 395078 ||  || — || April 20, 2009 || Kitt Peak || Spacewatch || H || align=right data-sort-value="0.71" | 710 m || 
|-id=079 bgcolor=#E9E9E9
| 395079 ||  || — || April 2, 2009 || Mount Lemmon || Mount Lemmon Survey || HOF || align=right | 2.5 km || 
|-id=080 bgcolor=#d6d6d6
| 395080 ||  || — || April 3, 2003 || Anderson Mesa || LONEOS || — || align=right | 4.0 km || 
|-id=081 bgcolor=#d6d6d6
| 395081 ||  || — || November 25, 2006 || Kitt Peak || Spacewatch || EOS || align=right | 1.9 km || 
|-id=082 bgcolor=#E9E9E9
| 395082 ||  || — || March 21, 2009 || Kitt Peak || Spacewatch || HOF || align=right | 2.5 km || 
|-id=083 bgcolor=#d6d6d6
| 395083 ||  || — || April 27, 2009 || Kitt Peak || Spacewatch || — || align=right | 3.7 km || 
|-id=084 bgcolor=#d6d6d6
| 395084 ||  || — || April 22, 2009 || La Sagra || OAM Obs. || — || align=right | 2.6 km || 
|-id=085 bgcolor=#d6d6d6
| 395085 ||  || — || April 30, 2009 || Mount Lemmon || Mount Lemmon Survey || — || align=right | 2.5 km || 
|-id=086 bgcolor=#d6d6d6
| 395086 ||  || — || April 17, 2009 || Kitt Peak || Spacewatch || — || align=right | 3.2 km || 
|-id=087 bgcolor=#d6d6d6
| 395087 ||  || — || April 2, 2009 || Kitt Peak || Spacewatch || — || align=right | 2.6 km || 
|-id=088 bgcolor=#d6d6d6
| 395088 ||  || — || April 30, 2009 || Mount Lemmon || Mount Lemmon Survey || — || align=right | 2.9 km || 
|-id=089 bgcolor=#d6d6d6
| 395089 ||  || — || April 30, 2009 || Kitt Peak || Spacewatch || — || align=right | 5.3 km || 
|-id=090 bgcolor=#d6d6d6
| 395090 ||  || — || May 1, 2009 || Kitt Peak || Spacewatch || — || align=right | 2.7 km || 
|-id=091 bgcolor=#d6d6d6
| 395091 ||  || — || May 25, 2009 || Kitt Peak || Spacewatch || — || align=right | 4.3 km || 
|-id=092 bgcolor=#d6d6d6
| 395092 ||  || — || April 18, 2009 || Mount Lemmon || Mount Lemmon Survey || — || align=right | 2.9 km || 
|-id=093 bgcolor=#d6d6d6
| 395093 ||  || — || May 25, 2009 || Kitt Peak || Spacewatch || TIR || align=right | 3.4 km || 
|-id=094 bgcolor=#d6d6d6
| 395094 ||  || — || May 27, 2009 || Kitt Peak || Spacewatch || — || align=right | 3.0 km || 
|-id=095 bgcolor=#d6d6d6
| 395095 ||  || — || May 30, 2009 || Mount Lemmon || Mount Lemmon Survey || — || align=right | 3.2 km || 
|-id=096 bgcolor=#d6d6d6
| 395096 ||  || — || May 31, 2009 || Bergisch Gladbach || W. Bickel || — || align=right | 3.7 km || 
|-id=097 bgcolor=#fefefe
| 395097 ||  || — || February 28, 2009 || Mount Lemmon || Mount Lemmon Survey || H || align=right data-sort-value="0.75" | 750 m || 
|-id=098 bgcolor=#d6d6d6
| 395098 ||  || — || June 19, 2009 || Kitt Peak || Spacewatch || — || align=right | 2.5 km || 
|-id=099 bgcolor=#d6d6d6
| 395099 ||  || — || September 11, 2004 || Socorro || LINEAR || — || align=right | 3.9 km || 
|-id=100 bgcolor=#d6d6d6
| 395100 ||  || — || July 26, 2009 || Bergisch Gladbac || W. Bickel || — || align=right | 2.3 km || 
|}

395101–395200 

|-bgcolor=#d6d6d6
| 395101 ||  || — || July 31, 2009 || Bergisch Gladbac || W. Bickel || — || align=right | 2.6 km || 
|-id=102 bgcolor=#d6d6d6
| 395102 ||  || — || August 29, 2009 || La Sagra || OAM Obs. || — || align=right | 3.8 km || 
|-id=103 bgcolor=#d6d6d6
| 395103 ||  || — || September 12, 2009 || Kitt Peak || Spacewatch || — || align=right | 4.9 km || 
|-id=104 bgcolor=#d6d6d6
| 395104 ||  || — || September 12, 2009 || Kitt Peak || Spacewatch || EOS || align=right | 2.0 km || 
|-id=105 bgcolor=#C2FFFF
| 395105 ||  || — || September 15, 2009 || Kitt Peak || Spacewatch || L4 || align=right | 7.6 km || 
|-id=106 bgcolor=#fefefe
| 395106 ||  || — || September 16, 2009 || Kitt Peak || Spacewatch || — || align=right data-sort-value="0.53" | 530 m || 
|-id=107 bgcolor=#d6d6d6
| 395107 || 2009 TL || — || October 7, 2009 || Siding Spring || SSS || — || align=right | 3.8 km || 
|-id=108 bgcolor=#d6d6d6
| 395108 ||  || — || October 9, 2009 || Siding Spring || SSS || — || align=right | 3.1 km || 
|-id=109 bgcolor=#fefefe
| 395109 ||  || — || September 15, 2009 || Kitt Peak || Spacewatch || H || align=right data-sort-value="0.68" | 680 m || 
|-id=110 bgcolor=#C2FFFF
| 395110 ||  || — || September 28, 2009 || Mount Lemmon || Mount Lemmon Survey || L4 || align=right | 7.2 km || 
|-id=111 bgcolor=#fefefe
| 395111 ||  || — || November 9, 2009 || Mount Lemmon || Mount Lemmon Survey || — || align=right data-sort-value="0.74" | 740 m || 
|-id=112 bgcolor=#fefefe
| 395112 ||  || — || November 10, 1999 || Kitt Peak || Spacewatch || — || align=right data-sort-value="0.64" | 640 m || 
|-id=113 bgcolor=#d6d6d6
| 395113 ||  || — || November 11, 2009 || La Sagra || OAM Obs. || Tj (2.99) || align=right | 4.8 km || 
|-id=114 bgcolor=#fefefe
| 395114 ||  || — || April 19, 2004 || Kitt Peak || Spacewatch || — || align=right data-sort-value="0.78" | 780 m || 
|-id=115 bgcolor=#C2FFFF
| 395115 ||  || — || November 8, 2009 || Mount Lemmon || Mount Lemmon Survey || L4 || align=right | 6.6 km || 
|-id=116 bgcolor=#fefefe
| 395116 ||  || — || November 9, 2009 || Kitt Peak || Spacewatch || — || align=right data-sort-value="0.78" | 780 m || 
|-id=117 bgcolor=#fefefe
| 395117 ||  || — || March 13, 2007 || Kitt Peak || Spacewatch || — || align=right data-sort-value="0.67" | 670 m || 
|-id=118 bgcolor=#fefefe
| 395118 ||  || — || November 18, 2009 || Kitt Peak || Spacewatch || — || align=right data-sort-value="0.60" | 600 m || 
|-id=119 bgcolor=#fefefe
| 395119 ||  || — || November 8, 2009 || Kitt Peak || Spacewatch || — || align=right data-sort-value="0.67" | 670 m || 
|-id=120 bgcolor=#fefefe
| 395120 ||  || — || October 1, 2005 || Mount Lemmon || Mount Lemmon Survey || NYS || align=right data-sort-value="0.60" | 600 m || 
|-id=121 bgcolor=#fefefe
| 395121 ||  || — || November 26, 2009 || Mount Lemmon || Mount Lemmon Survey || — || align=right | 1.1 km || 
|-id=122 bgcolor=#fefefe
| 395122 ||  || — || November 18, 2009 || Mount Lemmon || Mount Lemmon Survey || — || align=right data-sort-value="0.96" | 960 m || 
|-id=123 bgcolor=#fefefe
| 395123 || 2009 XY || — || December 9, 2009 || Nazaret || G. Muler || — || align=right | 1.2 km || 
|-id=124 bgcolor=#fefefe
| 395124 ||  || — || December 10, 2009 || San Marcello || Pistoia Mountains Obs. || — || align=right data-sort-value="0.93" | 930 m || 
|-id=125 bgcolor=#fefefe
| 395125 ||  || — || December 11, 2009 || Mount Lemmon || Mount Lemmon Survey || PHO || align=right data-sort-value="0.82" | 820 m || 
|-id=126 bgcolor=#fefefe
| 395126 ||  || — || December 18, 2009 || Mount Lemmon || Mount Lemmon Survey || — || align=right data-sort-value="0.88" | 880 m || 
|-id=127 bgcolor=#fefefe
| 395127 ||  || — || December 18, 2009 || Kitt Peak || Spacewatch || — || align=right data-sort-value="0.81" | 810 m || 
|-id=128 bgcolor=#fefefe
| 395128 ||  || — || December 27, 2009 || Kitt Peak || Spacewatch || — || align=right data-sort-value="0.62" | 620 m || 
|-id=129 bgcolor=#fefefe
| 395129 ||  || — || June 9, 2007 || Kitt Peak || Spacewatch || — || align=right data-sort-value="0.67" | 670 m || 
|-id=130 bgcolor=#fefefe
| 395130 ||  || — || December 18, 2009 || Kitt Peak || Spacewatch || — || align=right data-sort-value="0.70" | 700 m || 
|-id=131 bgcolor=#fefefe
| 395131 ||  || — || January 5, 2010 || Kitt Peak || Spacewatch || — || align=right data-sort-value="0.71" | 710 m || 
|-id=132 bgcolor=#fefefe
| 395132 ||  || — || January 7, 2010 || Mount Lemmon || Mount Lemmon Survey || — || align=right data-sort-value="0.81" | 810 m || 
|-id=133 bgcolor=#fefefe
| 395133 ||  || — || April 11, 2007 || Kitt Peak || Spacewatch || (2076) || align=right data-sort-value="0.69" | 690 m || 
|-id=134 bgcolor=#fefefe
| 395134 ||  || — || January 7, 2010 || Mount Lemmon || Mount Lemmon Survey || — || align=right | 1.4 km || 
|-id=135 bgcolor=#fefefe
| 395135 ||  || — || December 1, 2005 || Kitt Peak || Spacewatch || — || align=right data-sort-value="0.83" | 830 m || 
|-id=136 bgcolor=#fefefe
| 395136 ||  || — || January 7, 2010 || Kitt Peak || Spacewatch || — || align=right data-sort-value="0.96" | 960 m || 
|-id=137 bgcolor=#fefefe
| 395137 ||  || — || March 31, 2003 || Kitt Peak || Spacewatch || MAS || align=right data-sort-value="0.79" | 790 m || 
|-id=138 bgcolor=#fefefe
| 395138 ||  || — || January 12, 2010 || WISE || WISE || — || align=right | 2.8 km || 
|-id=139 bgcolor=#E9E9E9
| 395139 ||  || — || May 1, 2006 || Kitt Peak || Spacewatch || — || align=right | 2.5 km || 
|-id=140 bgcolor=#C2FFFF
| 395140 ||  || — || October 30, 2009 || Mount Lemmon || Mount Lemmon Survey || L4 || align=right | 10 km || 
|-id=141 bgcolor=#fefefe
| 395141 Césarmanrique ||  ||  || February 4, 2010 || Nazaret || G. Muler, J. M. Ruiz || — || align=right data-sort-value="0.67" | 670 m || 
|-id=142 bgcolor=#fefefe
| 395142 || 2010 CG || — || February 6, 2010 || Pla D'Arguines || R. Ferrando || — || align=right data-sort-value="0.94" | 940 m || 
|-id=143 bgcolor=#FFC2E0
| 395143 ||  || — || February 2, 2010 || WISE || WISE || APO || align=right data-sort-value="0.64" | 640 m || 
|-id=144 bgcolor=#fefefe
| 395144 ||  || — || February 5, 2010 || Kitt Peak || Spacewatch || NYS || align=right data-sort-value="0.62" | 620 m || 
|-id=145 bgcolor=#fefefe
| 395145 ||  || — || January 8, 2010 || Kitt Peak || Spacewatch || NYS || align=right data-sort-value="0.55" | 550 m || 
|-id=146 bgcolor=#fefefe
| 395146 ||  || — || February 9, 2010 || Mount Lemmon || Mount Lemmon Survey || — || align=right data-sort-value="0.79" | 790 m || 
|-id=147 bgcolor=#fefefe
| 395147 ||  || — || September 3, 2005 || Catalina || CSS || — || align=right data-sort-value="0.74" | 740 m || 
|-id=148 bgcolor=#fefefe
| 395148 Kurnin ||  ||  || February 10, 2010 || Zelenchukskaya || T. V. Kryachko || — || align=right | 1.9 km || 
|-id=149 bgcolor=#E9E9E9
| 395149 ||  || — || February 11, 2010 || WISE || WISE || — || align=right | 1.8 km || 
|-id=150 bgcolor=#E9E9E9
| 395150 ||  || — || February 12, 2010 || WISE || WISE || — || align=right | 1.6 km || 
|-id=151 bgcolor=#fefefe
| 395151 ||  || — || May 8, 2007 || Anderson Mesa || LONEOS || NYS || align=right data-sort-value="0.69" | 690 m || 
|-id=152 bgcolor=#fefefe
| 395152 ||  || — || October 24, 2008 || Mount Lemmon || Mount Lemmon Survey || NYS || align=right data-sort-value="0.71" | 710 m || 
|-id=153 bgcolor=#fefefe
| 395153 ||  || — || February 10, 2010 || Kitt Peak || Spacewatch || — || align=right data-sort-value="0.75" | 750 m || 
|-id=154 bgcolor=#fefefe
| 395154 ||  || — || October 26, 2005 || Kitt Peak || Spacewatch || — || align=right data-sort-value="0.80" | 800 m || 
|-id=155 bgcolor=#fefefe
| 395155 ||  || — || February 23, 2007 || Kitt Peak || Spacewatch || — || align=right data-sort-value="0.75" | 750 m || 
|-id=156 bgcolor=#fefefe
| 395156 ||  || — || February 14, 2010 || Catalina || CSS || V || align=right data-sort-value="0.67" | 670 m || 
|-id=157 bgcolor=#fefefe
| 395157 ||  || — || January 11, 2010 || Kitt Peak || Spacewatch || NYS || align=right data-sort-value="0.49" | 490 m || 
|-id=158 bgcolor=#E9E9E9
| 395158 ||  || — || February 15, 2010 || WISE || WISE || ADE || align=right | 2.3 km || 
|-id=159 bgcolor=#fefefe
| 395159 ||  || — || December 25, 2005 || Mount Lemmon || Mount Lemmon Survey || MAS || align=right data-sort-value="0.58" | 580 m || 
|-id=160 bgcolor=#fefefe
| 395160 ||  || — || February 14, 2010 || Catalina || CSS || — || align=right data-sort-value="0.89" | 890 m || 
|-id=161 bgcolor=#fefefe
| 395161 ||  || — || February 15, 2010 || Kitt Peak || Spacewatch || — || align=right | 1.3 km || 
|-id=162 bgcolor=#fefefe
| 395162 ||  || — || September 29, 2008 || Catalina || CSS || — || align=right data-sort-value="0.91" | 910 m || 
|-id=163 bgcolor=#fefefe
| 395163 ||  || — || February 14, 2010 || Kitt Peak || Spacewatch || — || align=right data-sort-value="0.77" | 770 m || 
|-id=164 bgcolor=#fefefe
| 395164 ||  || — || March 6, 1999 || Kitt Peak || Spacewatch || — || align=right data-sort-value="0.73" | 730 m || 
|-id=165 bgcolor=#fefefe
| 395165 ||  || — || June 16, 2007 || Kitt Peak || Spacewatch || V || align=right data-sort-value="0.60" | 600 m || 
|-id=166 bgcolor=#C2FFFF
| 395166 ||  || — || November 10, 2009 || Mount Lemmon || Mount Lemmon Survey || L4 || align=right | 14 km || 
|-id=167 bgcolor=#fefefe
| 395167 ||  || — || January 11, 2010 || Kitt Peak || Spacewatch || — || align=right data-sort-value="0.74" | 740 m || 
|-id=168 bgcolor=#fefefe
| 395168 ||  || — || February 17, 2010 || Kitt Peak || Spacewatch || NYS || align=right data-sort-value="0.57" | 570 m || 
|-id=169 bgcolor=#fefefe
| 395169 ||  || — || February 17, 2010 || Mount Lemmon || Mount Lemmon Survey || — || align=right data-sort-value="0.69" | 690 m || 
|-id=170 bgcolor=#fefefe
| 395170 ||  || — || February 18, 2010 || Kitt Peak || Spacewatch || — || align=right data-sort-value="0.75" | 750 m || 
|-id=171 bgcolor=#E9E9E9
| 395171 ||  || — || February 22, 2010 || WISE || WISE || — || align=right | 2.1 km || 
|-id=172 bgcolor=#E9E9E9
| 395172 ||  || — || March 3, 2010 || WISE || WISE || — || align=right | 2.5 km || 
|-id=173 bgcolor=#fefefe
| 395173 ||  || — || March 10, 2010 || Purple Mountain || PMO NEO || — || align=right data-sort-value="0.69" | 690 m || 
|-id=174 bgcolor=#E9E9E9
| 395174 ||  || — || May 7, 2006 || Kitt Peak || Spacewatch || EUN || align=right | 1.1 km || 
|-id=175 bgcolor=#fefefe
| 395175 ||  || — || February 1, 2006 || Mount Lemmon || Mount Lemmon Survey || — || align=right data-sort-value="0.83" | 830 m || 
|-id=176 bgcolor=#fefefe
| 395176 ||  || — || March 10, 2010 || La Sagra || OAM Obs. || MAS || align=right data-sort-value="0.71" | 710 m || 
|-id=177 bgcolor=#fefefe
| 395177 ||  || — || September 29, 2008 || Catalina || CSS || NYS || align=right data-sort-value="0.64" | 640 m || 
|-id=178 bgcolor=#fefefe
| 395178 ||  || — || March 12, 2010 || Mount Lemmon || Mount Lemmon Survey || — || align=right | 2.3 km || 
|-id=179 bgcolor=#fefefe
| 395179 ||  || — || March 13, 2010 || Kitt Peak || Spacewatch || NYS || align=right data-sort-value="0.60" | 600 m || 
|-id=180 bgcolor=#fefefe
| 395180 ||  || — || March 14, 2010 || La Sagra || OAM Obs. || — || align=right data-sort-value="0.84" | 840 m || 
|-id=181 bgcolor=#E9E9E9
| 395181 ||  || — || March 15, 2010 || Mount Lemmon || Mount Lemmon Survey || (5) || align=right data-sort-value="0.95" | 950 m || 
|-id=182 bgcolor=#FA8072
| 395182 ||  || — || March 14, 2010 || Kitt Peak || Spacewatch || — || align=right | 1.6 km || 
|-id=183 bgcolor=#fefefe
| 395183 ||  || — || February 24, 2006 || Kitt Peak || Spacewatch || MAS || align=right data-sort-value="0.75" | 750 m || 
|-id=184 bgcolor=#E9E9E9
| 395184 ||  || — || September 30, 2003 || Kitt Peak || Spacewatch || MAR || align=right | 1.2 km || 
|-id=185 bgcolor=#fefefe
| 395185 ||  || — || January 11, 2010 || Mount Lemmon || Mount Lemmon Survey || — || align=right data-sort-value="0.52" | 520 m || 
|-id=186 bgcolor=#E9E9E9
| 395186 ||  || — || March 25, 2010 || Kitt Peak || Spacewatch || KON || align=right | 2.4 km || 
|-id=187 bgcolor=#E9E9E9
| 395187 ||  || — || October 20, 1995 || Kitt Peak || Spacewatch || — || align=right | 1.5 km || 
|-id=188 bgcolor=#fefefe
| 395188 ||  || — || March 12, 2010 || Kitt Peak || Spacewatch || — || align=right | 1.8 km || 
|-id=189 bgcolor=#E9E9E9
| 395189 ||  || — || March 21, 2010 || Mount Lemmon || Mount Lemmon Survey || — || align=right | 1.2 km || 
|-id=190 bgcolor=#fefefe
| 395190 ||  || — || September 9, 2007 || Kitt Peak || Spacewatch || — || align=right data-sort-value="0.94" | 940 m || 
|-id=191 bgcolor=#fefefe
| 395191 ||  || — || April 8, 2010 || La Sagra || OAM Obs. || — || align=right | 1.6 km || 
|-id=192 bgcolor=#E9E9E9
| 395192 ||  || — || April 8, 2010 || Mount Lemmon || Mount Lemmon Survey || — || align=right | 1.6 km || 
|-id=193 bgcolor=#fefefe
| 395193 ||  || — || November 19, 2008 || Kitt Peak || Spacewatch || V || align=right data-sort-value="0.95" | 950 m || 
|-id=194 bgcolor=#fefefe
| 395194 ||  || — || April 4, 2010 || Kitt Peak || Spacewatch || — || align=right | 1.9 km || 
|-id=195 bgcolor=#E9E9E9
| 395195 ||  || — || April 2, 2006 || Kitt Peak || Spacewatch || — || align=right data-sort-value="0.93" | 930 m || 
|-id=196 bgcolor=#E9E9E9
| 395196 ||  || — || April 8, 2010 || Kitt Peak || Spacewatch || — || align=right | 1.3 km || 
|-id=197 bgcolor=#fefefe
| 395197 ||  || — || January 20, 2010 || WISE || WISE || — || align=right | 2.0 km || 
|-id=198 bgcolor=#fefefe
| 395198 ||  || — || April 10, 2010 || Mount Lemmon || Mount Lemmon Survey || — || align=right data-sort-value="0.99" | 990 m || 
|-id=199 bgcolor=#E9E9E9
| 395199 ||  || — || April 10, 2010 || Kitt Peak || Spacewatch || — || align=right | 1.3 km || 
|-id=200 bgcolor=#fefefe
| 395200 ||  || — || January 16, 2009 || Mount Lemmon || Mount Lemmon Survey || — || align=right | 1.1 km || 
|}

395201–395300 

|-bgcolor=#fefefe
| 395201 ||  || — || October 29, 2008 || Kitt Peak || Spacewatch || — || align=right | 1.0 km || 
|-id=202 bgcolor=#fefefe
| 395202 ||  || — || January 26, 2006 || Kitt Peak || Spacewatch || — || align=right data-sort-value="0.89" | 890 m || 
|-id=203 bgcolor=#E9E9E9
| 395203 ||  || — || April 10, 2010 || Mount Lemmon || Mount Lemmon Survey || — || align=right | 1.4 km || 
|-id=204 bgcolor=#E9E9E9
| 395204 ||  || — || March 19, 2010 || Mount Lemmon || Mount Lemmon Survey || — || align=right | 1.4 km || 
|-id=205 bgcolor=#d6d6d6
| 395205 ||  || — || April 21, 2010 || WISE || WISE || — || align=right | 4.8 km || 
|-id=206 bgcolor=#E9E9E9
| 395206 ||  || — || April 25, 2010 || WISE || WISE || — || align=right | 3.4 km || 
|-id=207 bgcolor=#FFC2E0
| 395207 ||  || — || April 25, 2010 || WISE || WISE || APOPHA || align=right data-sort-value="0.89" | 890 m || 
|-id=208 bgcolor=#E9E9E9
| 395208 ||  || — || May 3, 2010 || WISE || WISE || — || align=right | 2.6 km || 
|-id=209 bgcolor=#E9E9E9
| 395209 ||  || — || May 3, 2010 || WISE || WISE || — || align=right | 2.5 km || 
|-id=210 bgcolor=#E9E9E9
| 395210 ||  || — || May 3, 2010 || Kitt Peak || Spacewatch || — || align=right | 1.8 km || 
|-id=211 bgcolor=#E9E9E9
| 395211 ||  || — || September 13, 2007 || Kitt Peak || Spacewatch || — || align=right | 1.3 km || 
|-id=212 bgcolor=#E9E9E9
| 395212 ||  || — || May 9, 2010 || WISE || WISE || TIN || align=right | 1.7 km || 
|-id=213 bgcolor=#E9E9E9
| 395213 ||  || — || May 6, 2010 || Kitt Peak || Spacewatch || EUN || align=right | 1.5 km || 
|-id=214 bgcolor=#E9E9E9
| 395214 ||  || — || May 4, 2006 || Kitt Peak || Spacewatch || — || align=right | 1.1 km || 
|-id=215 bgcolor=#E9E9E9
| 395215 ||  || — || November 8, 2007 || Kitt Peak || Spacewatch || — || align=right | 1.3 km || 
|-id=216 bgcolor=#E9E9E9
| 395216 ||  || — || May 9, 2010 || WISE || WISE || — || align=right | 1.8 km || 
|-id=217 bgcolor=#E9E9E9
| 395217 ||  || — || May 13, 2010 || Nogales || Tenagra II Obs. || RAF || align=right | 1.1 km || 
|-id=218 bgcolor=#fefefe
| 395218 ||  || — || September 11, 2004 || Kitt Peak || Spacewatch || V || align=right data-sort-value="0.76" | 760 m || 
|-id=219 bgcolor=#E9E9E9
| 395219 ||  || — || October 11, 2007 || Kitt Peak || Spacewatch || (194) || align=right | 1.3 km || 
|-id=220 bgcolor=#d6d6d6
| 395220 ||  || — || May 29, 2010 || WISE || WISE || — || align=right | 3.9 km || 
|-id=221 bgcolor=#d6d6d6
| 395221 ||  || — || May 2, 2009 || Mount Lemmon || Mount Lemmon Survey || ELF || align=right | 3.5 km || 
|-id=222 bgcolor=#d6d6d6
| 395222 ||  || — || June 9, 2010 || WISE || WISE || VER || align=right | 3.0 km || 
|-id=223 bgcolor=#E9E9E9
| 395223 ||  || — || May 19, 2010 || Catalina || CSS || — || align=right | 1.4 km || 
|-id=224 bgcolor=#d6d6d6
| 395224 ||  || — || June 10, 2010 || WISE || WISE || — || align=right | 3.2 km || 
|-id=225 bgcolor=#d6d6d6
| 395225 ||  || — || June 13, 2010 || WISE || WISE || — || align=right | 3.6 km || 
|-id=226 bgcolor=#d6d6d6
| 395226 ||  || — || December 5, 2008 || Mount Lemmon || Mount Lemmon Survey || BRA || align=right | 1.7 km || 
|-id=227 bgcolor=#E9E9E9
| 395227 ||  || — || May 19, 2010 || Mount Lemmon || Mount Lemmon Survey || — || align=right data-sort-value="0.98" | 980 m || 
|-id=228 bgcolor=#d6d6d6
| 395228 ||  || — || June 18, 2010 || WISE || WISE || — || align=right | 4.7 km || 
|-id=229 bgcolor=#d6d6d6
| 395229 ||  || — || September 25, 2005 || Kitt Peak || Spacewatch || — || align=right | 2.5 km || 
|-id=230 bgcolor=#d6d6d6
| 395230 ||  || — || June 19, 2010 || WISE || WISE || — || align=right | 3.3 km || 
|-id=231 bgcolor=#d6d6d6
| 395231 ||  || — || November 25, 2005 || Catalina || CSS || VER || align=right | 3.5 km || 
|-id=232 bgcolor=#d6d6d6
| 395232 ||  || — || June 24, 2010 || WISE || WISE || — || align=right | 2.5 km || 
|-id=233 bgcolor=#d6d6d6
| 395233 ||  || — || June 25, 2010 || WISE || WISE || — || align=right | 4.5 km || 
|-id=234 bgcolor=#d6d6d6
| 395234 ||  || — || June 26, 2010 || WISE || WISE || — || align=right | 4.1 km || 
|-id=235 bgcolor=#d6d6d6
| 395235 ||  || — || October 29, 2005 || Catalina || CSS || — || align=right | 2.4 km || 
|-id=236 bgcolor=#d6d6d6
| 395236 ||  || — || February 7, 2008 || Mount Lemmon || Mount Lemmon Survey || — || align=right | 2.8 km || 
|-id=237 bgcolor=#d6d6d6
| 395237 ||  || — || March 27, 2008 || Mount Lemmon || Mount Lemmon Survey || — || align=right | 2.6 km || 
|-id=238 bgcolor=#d6d6d6
| 395238 ||  || — || January 17, 2007 || Kitt Peak || Spacewatch || — || align=right | 4.1 km || 
|-id=239 bgcolor=#d6d6d6
| 395239 ||  || — || October 4, 1999 || Catalina || CSS || — || align=right | 3.8 km || 
|-id=240 bgcolor=#d6d6d6
| 395240 ||  || — || February 9, 2008 || Kitt Peak || Spacewatch || — || align=right | 3.3 km || 
|-id=241 bgcolor=#d6d6d6
| 395241 ||  || — || July 11, 2010 || WISE || WISE || — || align=right | 3.5 km || 
|-id=242 bgcolor=#d6d6d6
| 395242 ||  || — || August 22, 2004 || Kitt Peak || Spacewatch || — || align=right | 3.4 km || 
|-id=243 bgcolor=#d6d6d6
| 395243 ||  || — || December 1, 2005 || Mount Lemmon || Mount Lemmon Survey || — || align=right | 2.5 km || 
|-id=244 bgcolor=#d6d6d6
| 395244 ||  || — || June 17, 2004 || Siding Spring || SSS || — || align=right | 5.1 km || 
|-id=245 bgcolor=#d6d6d6
| 395245 ||  || — || July 13, 2010 || WISE || WISE || HYG || align=right | 2.9 km || 
|-id=246 bgcolor=#d6d6d6
| 395246 ||  || — || February 9, 2008 || Kitt Peak || Spacewatch || — || align=right | 3.3 km || 
|-id=247 bgcolor=#d6d6d6
| 395247 ||  || — || July 17, 2010 || WISE || WISE || EUP || align=right | 3.5 km || 
|-id=248 bgcolor=#d6d6d6
| 395248 ||  || — || May 26, 2009 || Catalina || CSS || — || align=right | 2.2 km || 
|-id=249 bgcolor=#d6d6d6
| 395249 ||  || — || July 19, 2010 || WISE || WISE || — || align=right | 4.0 km || 
|-id=250 bgcolor=#E9E9E9
| 395250 ||  || — || July 27, 2010 || WISE || WISE || — || align=right | 3.0 km || 
|-id=251 bgcolor=#d6d6d6
| 395251 ||  || — || June 15, 2009 || XuYi || PMO NEO || — || align=right | 5.8 km || 
|-id=252 bgcolor=#d6d6d6
| 395252 ||  || — || April 24, 2003 || Kitt Peak || Spacewatch || — || align=right | 3.1 km || 
|-id=253 bgcolor=#d6d6d6
| 395253 ||  || — || October 17, 1995 || Kitt Peak || Spacewatch || EOS || align=right | 2.0 km || 
|-id=254 bgcolor=#d6d6d6
| 395254 ||  || — || May 26, 2009 || Kitt Peak || Spacewatch || — || align=right | 1.8 km || 
|-id=255 bgcolor=#d6d6d6
| 395255 ||  || — || February 9, 2008 || Mount Lemmon || Mount Lemmon Survey || — || align=right | 2.1 km || 
|-id=256 bgcolor=#d6d6d6
| 395256 ||  || — || February 8, 2008 || Mount Lemmon || Mount Lemmon Survey || — || align=right | 2.7 km || 
|-id=257 bgcolor=#d6d6d6
| 395257 ||  || — || August 14, 2010 || Kitt Peak || Spacewatch || — || align=right | 2.6 km || 
|-id=258 bgcolor=#d6d6d6
| 395258 ||  || — || October 29, 2005 || Mount Lemmon || Mount Lemmon Survey || — || align=right | 4.9 km || 
|-id=259 bgcolor=#d6d6d6
| 395259 ||  || — || August 11, 2004 || Socorro || LINEAR || — || align=right | 3.2 km || 
|-id=260 bgcolor=#E9E9E9
| 395260 ||  || — || August 17, 2010 || Črni Vrh || Črni Vrh || — || align=right | 2.4 km || 
|-id=261 bgcolor=#d6d6d6
| 395261 ||  || — || October 28, 2005 || Mount Lemmon || Mount Lemmon Survey || — || align=right | 2.6 km || 
|-id=262 bgcolor=#d6d6d6
| 395262 ||  || — || August 12, 2010 || Kitt Peak || Spacewatch || — || align=right | 3.3 km || 
|-id=263 bgcolor=#d6d6d6
| 395263 ||  || — || September 10, 2010 || Kitt Peak || Spacewatch || — || align=right | 2.5 km || 
|-id=264 bgcolor=#d6d6d6
| 395264 ||  || — || October 27, 2005 || Mount Lemmon || Mount Lemmon Survey || THM || align=right | 2.1 km || 
|-id=265 bgcolor=#d6d6d6
| 395265 ||  || — || September 30, 2005 || Mount Lemmon || Mount Lemmon Survey || — || align=right | 2.6 km || 
|-id=266 bgcolor=#d6d6d6
| 395266 ||  || — || September 16, 2010 || Mount Lemmon || Mount Lemmon Survey || — || align=right | 3.7 km || 
|-id=267 bgcolor=#d6d6d6
| 395267 ||  || — || December 1, 2000 || Kitt Peak || Spacewatch || EOS || align=right | 2.5 km || 
|-id=268 bgcolor=#d6d6d6
| 395268 ||  || — || October 1, 2005 || Kitt Peak || Spacewatch || — || align=right | 3.1 km || 
|-id=269 bgcolor=#d6d6d6
| 395269 ||  || — || November 25, 2005 || Mount Lemmon || Mount Lemmon Survey || — || align=right | 3.0 km || 
|-id=270 bgcolor=#d6d6d6
| 395270 ||  || — || January 30, 2008 || Mount Lemmon || Mount Lemmon Survey || — || align=right | 3.2 km || 
|-id=271 bgcolor=#d6d6d6
| 395271 ||  || — || October 11, 2005 || Kitt Peak || Spacewatch || — || align=right | 2.3 km || 
|-id=272 bgcolor=#d6d6d6
| 395272 ||  || — || October 25, 2005 || Kitt Peak || Spacewatch || — || align=right | 2.5 km || 
|-id=273 bgcolor=#d6d6d6
| 395273 ||  || — || February 22, 2007 || Kitt Peak || Spacewatch || — || align=right | 3.6 km || 
|-id=274 bgcolor=#FA8072
| 395274 ||  || — || October 13, 2005 || Kitt Peak || Spacewatch || H || align=right data-sort-value="0.46" | 460 m || 
|-id=275 bgcolor=#d6d6d6
| 395275 ||  || — || May 28, 1998 || Kitt Peak || Spacewatch || — || align=right | 2.9 km || 
|-id=276 bgcolor=#d6d6d6
| 395276 ||  || — || August 7, 2010 || WISE || WISE || — || align=right | 3.9 km || 
|-id=277 bgcolor=#d6d6d6
| 395277 ||  || — || December 9, 1999 || Kitt Peak || Spacewatch || — || align=right | 3.9 km || 
|-id=278 bgcolor=#d6d6d6
| 395278 ||  || — || April 4, 2008 || Kitt Peak || Spacewatch || — || align=right | 2.8 km || 
|-id=279 bgcolor=#d6d6d6
| 395279 ||  || — || September 30, 1999 || Socorro || LINEAR || — || align=right | 2.9 km || 
|-id=280 bgcolor=#d6d6d6
| 395280 ||  || — || September 17, 2004 || Kitt Peak || Spacewatch || — || align=right | 2.9 km || 
|-id=281 bgcolor=#C2FFFF
| 395281 ||  || — || September 21, 2009 || Catalina || CSS || L4 || align=right | 8.7 km || 
|-id=282 bgcolor=#d6d6d6
| 395282 ||  || — || October 27, 2003 || Kitt Peak || Spacewatch || ULA7:4 || align=right | 5.4 km || 
|-id=283 bgcolor=#d6d6d6
| 395283 ||  || — || October 14, 2010 || Mount Lemmon || Mount Lemmon Survey || — || align=right | 4.1 km || 
|-id=284 bgcolor=#d6d6d6
| 395284 ||  || — || December 30, 2005 || Kitt Peak || Spacewatch || — || align=right | 3.1 km || 
|-id=285 bgcolor=#C2FFFF
| 395285 ||  || — || May 14, 2004 || Kitt Peak || Spacewatch || L4 || align=right | 11 km || 
|-id=286 bgcolor=#E9E9E9
| 395286 ||  || — || September 18, 2009 || Catalina || CSS || — || align=right | 2.1 km || 
|-id=287 bgcolor=#fefefe
| 395287 ||  || — || March 12, 2008 || Kitt Peak || Spacewatch || — || align=right data-sort-value="0.67" | 670 m || 
|-id=288 bgcolor=#fefefe
| 395288 ||  || — || November 12, 2005 || Kitt Peak || Spacewatch || H || align=right data-sort-value="0.84" | 840 m || 
|-id=289 bgcolor=#FFC2E0
| 395289 ||  || — || January 16, 2011 || Mount Lemmon || Mount Lemmon Survey || APO || align=right data-sort-value="0.78" | 780 m || 
|-id=290 bgcolor=#fefefe
| 395290 ||  || — || August 15, 2004 || Siding Spring || SSS || H || align=right data-sort-value="0.94" | 940 m || 
|-id=291 bgcolor=#fefefe
| 395291 ||  || — || March 5, 2006 || Catalina || CSS || H || align=right data-sort-value="0.98" | 980 m || 
|-id=292 bgcolor=#fefefe
| 395292 ||  || — || February 22, 2011 || Kitt Peak || Spacewatch || H || align=right data-sort-value="0.84" | 840 m || 
|-id=293 bgcolor=#fefefe
| 395293 ||  || — || January 7, 2000 || Socorro || LINEAR || H || align=right | 1.1 km || 
|-id=294 bgcolor=#fefefe
| 395294 ||  || — || March 27, 2011 || Kitt Peak || Spacewatch || — || align=right data-sort-value="0.59" | 590 m || 
|-id=295 bgcolor=#fefefe
| 395295 ||  || — || September 18, 2003 || Kitt Peak || Spacewatch || — || align=right data-sort-value="0.60" | 600 m || 
|-id=296 bgcolor=#fefefe
| 395296 ||  || — || April 5, 2011 || Catalina || CSS || H || align=right data-sort-value="0.78" | 780 m || 
|-id=297 bgcolor=#d6d6d6
| 395297 ||  || — || November 18, 2008 || Kitt Peak || Spacewatch || 7:4 || align=right | 6.6 km || 
|-id=298 bgcolor=#fefefe
| 395298 ||  || — || November 9, 2009 || Kitt Peak || Spacewatch || — || align=right data-sort-value="0.72" | 720 m || 
|-id=299 bgcolor=#fefefe
| 395299 ||  || — || December 11, 2009 || Mount Lemmon || Mount Lemmon Survey || V || align=right data-sort-value="0.69" | 690 m || 
|-id=300 bgcolor=#fefefe
| 395300 ||  || — || January 26, 2007 || Kitt Peak || Spacewatch || — || align=right data-sort-value="0.76" | 760 m || 
|}

395301–395400 

|-bgcolor=#fefefe
| 395301 ||  || — || August 31, 2005 || Kitt Peak || Spacewatch || — || align=right data-sort-value="0.79" | 790 m || 
|-id=302 bgcolor=#fefefe
| 395302 ||  || — || August 30, 2005 || Kitt Peak || Spacewatch || — || align=right data-sort-value="0.58" | 580 m || 
|-id=303 bgcolor=#fefefe
| 395303 ||  || — || October 28, 2008 || Kitt Peak || Spacewatch || — || align=right data-sort-value="0.86" | 860 m || 
|-id=304 bgcolor=#fefefe
| 395304 ||  || — || February 16, 2010 || Mount Lemmon || Mount Lemmon Survey || — || align=right data-sort-value="0.86" | 860 m || 
|-id=305 bgcolor=#fefefe
| 395305 ||  || — || February 24, 2006 || Mount Lemmon || Mount Lemmon Survey || — || align=right data-sort-value="0.96" | 960 m || 
|-id=306 bgcolor=#fefefe
| 395306 ||  || — || October 28, 2008 || Kitt Peak || Spacewatch || — || align=right data-sort-value="0.71" | 710 m || 
|-id=307 bgcolor=#fefefe
| 395307 ||  || — || November 1, 2005 || Kitt Peak || Spacewatch || — || align=right data-sort-value="0.67" | 670 m || 
|-id=308 bgcolor=#fefefe
| 395308 ||  || — || April 12, 1999 || Kitt Peak || Spacewatch || — || align=right data-sort-value="0.92" | 920 m || 
|-id=309 bgcolor=#fefefe
| 395309 ||  || — || March 17, 2007 || Anderson Mesa || LONEOS || — || align=right | 1.1 km || 
|-id=310 bgcolor=#fefefe
| 395310 ||  || — || September 23, 2008 || Kitt Peak || Spacewatch || — || align=right data-sort-value="0.97" | 970 m || 
|-id=311 bgcolor=#fefefe
| 395311 ||  || — || January 6, 2010 || Kitt Peak || Spacewatch || — || align=right | 1.0 km || 
|-id=312 bgcolor=#fefefe
| 395312 ||  || — || July 8, 2004 || Siding Spring || SSS || — || align=right data-sort-value="0.90" | 900 m || 
|-id=313 bgcolor=#fefefe
| 395313 ||  || — || January 23, 2006 || Kitt Peak || Spacewatch || — || align=right | 1.1 km || 
|-id=314 bgcolor=#fefefe
| 395314 ||  || — || September 23, 2000 || Anderson Mesa || LONEOS || — || align=right data-sort-value="0.88" | 880 m || 
|-id=315 bgcolor=#fefefe
| 395315 ||  || — || July 1, 2011 || Mount Lemmon || Mount Lemmon Survey || — || align=right data-sort-value="0.75" | 750 m || 
|-id=316 bgcolor=#fefefe
| 395316 ||  || — || November 30, 2008 || Kitt Peak || Spacewatch || MAS || align=right data-sort-value="0.86" | 860 m || 
|-id=317 bgcolor=#fefefe
| 395317 ||  || — || October 15, 2004 || Mount Lemmon || Mount Lemmon Survey || — || align=right data-sort-value="0.75" | 750 m || 
|-id=318 bgcolor=#fefefe
| 395318 ||  || — || April 14, 2007 || Mount Lemmon || Mount Lemmon Survey || — || align=right data-sort-value="0.68" | 680 m || 
|-id=319 bgcolor=#fefefe
| 395319 ||  || — || May 9, 2007 || Kitt Peak || Spacewatch || — || align=right | 1.0 km || 
|-id=320 bgcolor=#fefefe
| 395320 ||  || — || December 25, 2005 || Kitt Peak || Spacewatch || — || align=right data-sort-value="0.92" | 920 m || 
|-id=321 bgcolor=#fefefe
| 395321 ||  || — || September 25, 1995 || Kitt Peak || Spacewatch || — || align=right data-sort-value="0.64" | 640 m || 
|-id=322 bgcolor=#fefefe
| 395322 ||  || — || November 10, 2004 || Kitt Peak || Spacewatch || — || align=right data-sort-value="0.76" | 760 m || 
|-id=323 bgcolor=#fefefe
| 395323 ||  || — || September 8, 1996 || Kitt Peak || Spacewatch || — || align=right | 1.2 km || 
|-id=324 bgcolor=#fefefe
| 395324 ||  || — || October 24, 2000 || Socorro || LINEAR || MAS || align=right data-sort-value="0.93" | 930 m || 
|-id=325 bgcolor=#fefefe
| 395325 ||  || — || December 13, 2004 || Campo Imperatore || CINEOS || — || align=right | 1.1 km || 
|-id=326 bgcolor=#E9E9E9
| 395326 ||  || — || October 19, 2007 || Catalina || CSS || — || align=right | 1.5 km || 
|-id=327 bgcolor=#fefefe
| 395327 ||  || — || August 1, 2011 || Siding Spring || SSS || — || align=right data-sort-value="0.90" | 900 m || 
|-id=328 bgcolor=#fefefe
| 395328 ||  || — || September 3, 2000 || Kitt Peak || Spacewatch || NYS || align=right data-sort-value="0.65" | 650 m || 
|-id=329 bgcolor=#fefefe
| 395329 ||  || — || August 22, 2004 || Kitt Peak || Spacewatch || — || align=right data-sort-value="0.75" | 750 m || 
|-id=330 bgcolor=#fefefe
| 395330 ||  || — || June 14, 2010 || WISE || WISE || — || align=right | 2.2 km || 
|-id=331 bgcolor=#fefefe
| 395331 ||  || — || August 26, 2000 || Socorro || LINEAR || — || align=right | 1.1 km || 
|-id=332 bgcolor=#fefefe
| 395332 ||  || — || December 4, 1996 || Kitt Peak || Spacewatch || — || align=right | 1.1 km || 
|-id=333 bgcolor=#fefefe
| 395333 ||  || — || August 4, 2011 || Siding Spring || SSS || NYS || align=right data-sort-value="0.86" | 860 m || 
|-id=334 bgcolor=#fefefe
| 395334 ||  || — || September 23, 2000 || Anderson Mesa || LONEOS || MAS || align=right data-sort-value="0.75" | 750 m || 
|-id=335 bgcolor=#fefefe
| 395335 ||  || — || June 17, 2007 || Kitt Peak || Spacewatch || — || align=right data-sort-value="0.68" | 680 m || 
|-id=336 bgcolor=#fefefe
| 395336 ||  || — || October 10, 2008 || Mount Lemmon || Mount Lemmon Survey || — || align=right data-sort-value="0.85" | 850 m || 
|-id=337 bgcolor=#fefefe
| 395337 ||  || — || March 14, 2010 || Mount Lemmon || Mount Lemmon Survey || NYS || align=right data-sort-value="0.74" | 740 m || 
|-id=338 bgcolor=#fefefe
| 395338 ||  || — || August 29, 2000 || Socorro || LINEAR || — || align=right data-sort-value="0.86" | 860 m || 
|-id=339 bgcolor=#FA8072
| 395339 ||  || — || July 11, 2004 || Socorro || LINEAR || — || align=right data-sort-value="0.71" | 710 m || 
|-id=340 bgcolor=#fefefe
| 395340 ||  || — || March 15, 2010 || Mount Lemmon || Mount Lemmon Survey || — || align=right | 1.0 km || 
|-id=341 bgcolor=#E9E9E9
| 395341 ||  || — || March 17, 2005 || Kitt Peak || Spacewatch || EUN || align=right | 1.3 km || 
|-id=342 bgcolor=#fefefe
| 395342 ||  || — || September 10, 2004 || Kitt Peak || Spacewatch || — || align=right data-sort-value="0.65" | 650 m || 
|-id=343 bgcolor=#fefefe
| 395343 ||  || — || March 24, 2003 || Kitt Peak || Spacewatch || NYS || align=right data-sort-value="0.68" | 680 m || 
|-id=344 bgcolor=#fefefe
| 395344 ||  || — || April 25, 2003 || Kitt Peak || Spacewatch || V || align=right data-sort-value="0.66" | 660 m || 
|-id=345 bgcolor=#fefefe
| 395345 ||  || — || March 12, 2007 || Kitt Peak || Spacewatch || — || align=right data-sort-value="0.85" | 850 m || 
|-id=346 bgcolor=#fefefe
| 395346 ||  || — || August 7, 2004 || Campo Imperatore || CINEOS || — || align=right data-sort-value="0.71" | 710 m || 
|-id=347 bgcolor=#fefefe
| 395347 ||  || — || February 14, 2010 || Kitt Peak || Spacewatch || ERI || align=right | 2.9 km || 
|-id=348 bgcolor=#fefefe
| 395348 ||  || — || December 30, 2008 || Kitt Peak || Spacewatch || NYS || align=right data-sort-value="0.66" | 660 m || 
|-id=349 bgcolor=#fefefe
| 395349 ||  || — || March 15, 2010 || Mount Lemmon || Mount Lemmon Survey || — || align=right data-sort-value="0.83" | 830 m || 
|-id=350 bgcolor=#fefefe
| 395350 ||  || — || December 16, 2000 || Kitt Peak || Spacewatch || — || align=right | 1.1 km || 
|-id=351 bgcolor=#fefefe
| 395351 ||  || — || September 10, 2007 || Catalina || CSS || — || align=right data-sort-value="0.99" | 990 m || 
|-id=352 bgcolor=#fefefe
| 395352 ||  || — || April 14, 2010 || Kitt Peak || Spacewatch || (2076) || align=right data-sort-value="0.88" | 880 m || 
|-id=353 bgcolor=#fefefe
| 395353 ||  || — || December 11, 2004 || Kitt Peak || Spacewatch || — || align=right | 1.2 km || 
|-id=354 bgcolor=#fefefe
| 395354 ||  || — || May 25, 2007 || Mount Lemmon || Mount Lemmon Survey || NYS || align=right data-sort-value="0.83" | 830 m || 
|-id=355 bgcolor=#E9E9E9
| 395355 ||  || — || April 12, 2005 || Mount Lemmon || Mount Lemmon Survey || HOF || align=right | 2.7 km || 
|-id=356 bgcolor=#fefefe
| 395356 ||  || — || October 5, 2004 || Kitt Peak || Spacewatch || — || align=right data-sort-value="0.82" | 820 m || 
|-id=357 bgcolor=#E9E9E9
| 395357 ||  || — || October 9, 2002 || Socorro || LINEAR || DOR || align=right | 2.3 km || 
|-id=358 bgcolor=#fefefe
| 395358 ||  || — || October 6, 2000 || Kitt Peak || Spacewatch || MAS || align=right | 1.0 km || 
|-id=359 bgcolor=#d6d6d6
| 395359 ||  || — || March 1, 2008 || Kitt Peak || Spacewatch || — || align=right | 3.5 km || 
|-id=360 bgcolor=#fefefe
| 395360 ||  || — || April 24, 2003 || Kitt Peak || Spacewatch || — || align=right | 1.1 km || 
|-id=361 bgcolor=#d6d6d6
| 395361 ||  || — || October 23, 2006 || Kitt Peak || Spacewatch || — || align=right | 3.1 km || 
|-id=362 bgcolor=#d6d6d6
| 395362 ||  || — || September 17, 2006 || Kitt Peak || Spacewatch || — || align=right | 2.2 km || 
|-id=363 bgcolor=#d6d6d6
| 395363 ||  || — || September 24, 2000 || Socorro || LINEAR || TIR || align=right | 3.7 km || 
|-id=364 bgcolor=#fefefe
| 395364 ||  || — || September 11, 2007 || Catalina || CSS || — || align=right | 1.4 km || 
|-id=365 bgcolor=#FA8072
| 395365 ||  || — || August 8, 2004 || Socorro || LINEAR || — || align=right data-sort-value="0.75" | 750 m || 
|-id=366 bgcolor=#fefefe
| 395366 ||  || — || June 23, 2007 || Kitt Peak || Spacewatch || NYS || align=right data-sort-value="0.70" | 700 m || 
|-id=367 bgcolor=#fefefe
| 395367 ||  || — || November 28, 2000 || Kitt Peak || Spacewatch || critical || align=right data-sort-value="0.82" | 820 m || 
|-id=368 bgcolor=#E9E9E9
| 395368 ||  || — || March 11, 2005 || Mount Lemmon || Mount Lemmon Survey || — || align=right | 2.0 km || 
|-id=369 bgcolor=#fefefe
| 395369 ||  || — || March 18, 2010 || Mount Lemmon || Mount Lemmon Survey || — || align=right data-sort-value="0.90" | 900 m || 
|-id=370 bgcolor=#E9E9E9
| 395370 ||  || — || September 26, 1998 || Socorro || LINEAR || — || align=right | 3.3 km || 
|-id=371 bgcolor=#fefefe
| 395371 ||  || — || November 4, 2004 || Catalina || CSS || — || align=right data-sort-value="0.82" | 820 m || 
|-id=372 bgcolor=#fefefe
| 395372 ||  || — || March 5, 2006 || Kitt Peak || Spacewatch || — || align=right | 2.4 km || 
|-id=373 bgcolor=#d6d6d6
| 395373 ||  || — || February 22, 2009 || Siding Spring || SSS || BRA || align=right | 2.3 km || 
|-id=374 bgcolor=#E9E9E9
| 395374 ||  || — || September 22, 2011 || Kitt Peak || Spacewatch || AGN || align=right | 1.2 km || 
|-id=375 bgcolor=#fefefe
| 395375 ||  || — || August 9, 2007 || Socorro || LINEAR || MAS || align=right data-sort-value="0.91" | 910 m || 
|-id=376 bgcolor=#E9E9E9
| 395376 ||  || — || October 11, 1998 || Anderson Mesa || LONEOS || — || align=right | 1.5 km || 
|-id=377 bgcolor=#E9E9E9
| 395377 ||  || — || September 13, 2007 || Mount Lemmon || Mount Lemmon Survey || — || align=right | 1.3 km || 
|-id=378 bgcolor=#d6d6d6
| 395378 ||  || — || March 5, 2008 || Mount Lemmon || Mount Lemmon Survey || HYG || align=right | 2.2 km || 
|-id=379 bgcolor=#d6d6d6
| 395379 ||  || — || July 25, 2006 || Mount Lemmon || Mount Lemmon Survey || — || align=right | 2.4 km || 
|-id=380 bgcolor=#d6d6d6
| 395380 ||  || — || July 21, 2006 || Mount Lemmon || Mount Lemmon Survey || NAE || align=right | 2.4 km || 
|-id=381 bgcolor=#E9E9E9
| 395381 ||  || — || October 14, 2007 || Mount Lemmon || Mount Lemmon Survey || — || align=right | 2.2 km || 
|-id=382 bgcolor=#fefefe
| 395382 ||  || — || July 1, 2011 || Mount Lemmon || Mount Lemmon Survey || MAS || align=right data-sort-value="0.78" | 780 m || 
|-id=383 bgcolor=#fefefe
| 395383 ||  || — || August 24, 2007 || Kitt Peak || Spacewatch || MAS || align=right data-sort-value="0.72" | 720 m || 
|-id=384 bgcolor=#E9E9E9
| 395384 ||  || — || September 8, 2007 || Mount Lemmon || Mount Lemmon Survey || — || align=right data-sort-value="0.97" | 970 m || 
|-id=385 bgcolor=#fefefe
| 395385 ||  || — || October 15, 2004 || Mount Lemmon || Mount Lemmon Survey || MAS || align=right data-sort-value="0.82" | 820 m || 
|-id=386 bgcolor=#E9E9E9
| 395386 ||  || — || February 26, 2009 || Kitt Peak || Spacewatch || — || align=right | 2.4 km || 
|-id=387 bgcolor=#E9E9E9
| 395387 ||  || — || October 20, 2007 || Mount Lemmon || Mount Lemmon Survey || — || align=right | 2.0 km || 
|-id=388 bgcolor=#E9E9E9
| 395388 ||  || — || September 24, 1960 || Palomar || PLS || — || align=right | 2.3 km || 
|-id=389 bgcolor=#E9E9E9
| 395389 ||  || — || January 16, 2004 || Kitt Peak || Spacewatch || — || align=right | 1.4 km || 
|-id=390 bgcolor=#fefefe
| 395390 ||  || — || October 15, 2004 || Kitt Peak || Spacewatch || — || align=right | 2.3 km || 
|-id=391 bgcolor=#E9E9E9
| 395391 ||  || — || November 13, 2007 || Kitt Peak || Spacewatch || NEM || align=right | 2.3 km || 
|-id=392 bgcolor=#fefefe
| 395392 ||  || — || November 1, 2000 || Kitt Peak || Spacewatch || — || align=right data-sort-value="0.98" | 980 m || 
|-id=393 bgcolor=#d6d6d6
| 395393 ||  || — || September 22, 2011 || Kitt Peak || Spacewatch || — || align=right | 3.3 km || 
|-id=394 bgcolor=#E9E9E9
| 395394 ||  || — || November 5, 2007 || Kitt Peak || Spacewatch || — || align=right | 1.4 km || 
|-id=395 bgcolor=#fefefe
| 395395 ||  || — || August 22, 2004 || Siding Spring || SSS || — || align=right data-sort-value="0.85" | 850 m || 
|-id=396 bgcolor=#fefefe
| 395396 ||  || — || July 19, 2007 || Siding Spring || SSS || — || align=right | 1.1 km || 
|-id=397 bgcolor=#d6d6d6
| 395397 ||  || — || October 21, 2006 || Mount Lemmon || Mount Lemmon Survey || — || align=right | 2.6 km || 
|-id=398 bgcolor=#E9E9E9
| 395398 ||  || — || November 4, 2007 || Kitt Peak || Spacewatch || — || align=right | 1.8 km || 
|-id=399 bgcolor=#fefefe
| 395399 ||  || — || November 17, 2004 || Campo Imperatore || CINEOS || — || align=right data-sort-value="0.90" | 900 m || 
|-id=400 bgcolor=#E9E9E9
| 395400 ||  || — || February 21, 2009 || Kitt Peak || Spacewatch || — || align=right | 2.6 km || 
|}

395401–395500 

|-bgcolor=#d6d6d6
| 395401 ||  || — || October 16, 2006 || Catalina || CSS || — || align=right | 3.2 km || 
|-id=402 bgcolor=#FA8072
| 395402 ||  || — || September 12, 1994 || Kitt Peak || Spacewatch || — || align=right data-sort-value="0.58" | 580 m || 
|-id=403 bgcolor=#E9E9E9
| 395403 ||  || — || October 14, 2007 || Socorro || LINEAR || (194) || align=right | 1.6 km || 
|-id=404 bgcolor=#E9E9E9
| 395404 ||  || — || March 16, 2005 || Catalina || CSS || EUN || align=right | 1.2 km || 
|-id=405 bgcolor=#fefefe
| 395405 ||  || — || December 12, 2004 || Kitt Peak || Spacewatch || — || align=right data-sort-value="0.94" | 940 m || 
|-id=406 bgcolor=#fefefe
| 395406 ||  || — || September 23, 2000 || Anderson Mesa || LONEOS || — || align=right data-sort-value="0.86" | 860 m || 
|-id=407 bgcolor=#fefefe
| 395407 ||  || — || September 12, 2001 || Kitt Peak || Spacewatch || — || align=right data-sort-value="0.75" | 750 m || 
|-id=408 bgcolor=#E9E9E9
| 395408 ||  || — || March 1, 2009 || Kitt Peak || Spacewatch || — || align=right | 2.7 km || 
|-id=409 bgcolor=#E9E9E9
| 395409 ||  || — || February 1, 2009 || Kitt Peak || Spacewatch || — || align=right | 1.3 km || 
|-id=410 bgcolor=#E9E9E9
| 395410 ||  || — || March 21, 2009 || Kitt Peak || Spacewatch || WIT || align=right | 1.2 km || 
|-id=411 bgcolor=#d6d6d6
| 395411 ||  || — || September 30, 2006 || Mount Lemmon || Mount Lemmon Survey || — || align=right | 3.7 km || 
|-id=412 bgcolor=#E9E9E9
| 395412 ||  || — || September 23, 2011 || Kitt Peak || Spacewatch || — || align=right | 2.0 km || 
|-id=413 bgcolor=#E9E9E9
| 395413 ||  || — || September 23, 2011 || Kitt Peak || Spacewatch || — || align=right | 2.2 km || 
|-id=414 bgcolor=#d6d6d6
| 395414 ||  || — || September 26, 2011 || Mount Lemmon || Mount Lemmon Survey || KOR || align=right | 1.3 km || 
|-id=415 bgcolor=#d6d6d6
| 395415 ||  || — || September 28, 2011 || Mount Lemmon || Mount Lemmon Survey || — || align=right | 2.9 km || 
|-id=416 bgcolor=#E9E9E9
| 395416 ||  || — || February 20, 2009 || Kitt Peak || Spacewatch || — || align=right | 2.1 km || 
|-id=417 bgcolor=#fefefe
| 395417 ||  || — || June 20, 2007 || Kitt Peak || Spacewatch || MAS || align=right data-sort-value="0.79" | 790 m || 
|-id=418 bgcolor=#fefefe
| 395418 ||  || — || October 1, 2000 || Socorro || LINEAR || — || align=right data-sort-value="0.90" | 900 m || 
|-id=419 bgcolor=#E9E9E9
| 395419 ||  || — || March 16, 2004 || Kitt Peak || Spacewatch || — || align=right | 2.5 km || 
|-id=420 bgcolor=#d6d6d6
| 395420 ||  || — || November 25, 2006 || Mount Lemmon || Mount Lemmon Survey || — || align=right | 2.4 km || 
|-id=421 bgcolor=#E9E9E9
| 395421 ||  || — || February 4, 2009 || Kitt Peak || Spacewatch || (5) || align=right data-sort-value="0.93" | 930 m || 
|-id=422 bgcolor=#d6d6d6
| 395422 ||  || — || September 18, 2011 || Mount Lemmon || Mount Lemmon Survey || — || align=right | 3.2 km || 
|-id=423 bgcolor=#E9E9E9
| 395423 ||  || — || November 9, 2007 || Kitt Peak || Spacewatch || — || align=right | 2.1 km || 
|-id=424 bgcolor=#E9E9E9
| 395424 ||  || — || May 11, 2005 || Catalina || CSS || PAL || align=right | 2.5 km || 
|-id=425 bgcolor=#d6d6d6
| 395425 ||  || — || February 16, 2009 || Kitt Peak || Spacewatch || NAE || align=right | 2.3 km || 
|-id=426 bgcolor=#E9E9E9
| 395426 ||  || — || October 4, 2007 || Mount Lemmon || Mount Lemmon Survey || — || align=right | 1.2 km || 
|-id=427 bgcolor=#fefefe
| 395427 ||  || — || October 10, 2007 || Mount Lemmon || Mount Lemmon Survey || — || align=right data-sort-value="0.87" | 870 m || 
|-id=428 bgcolor=#E9E9E9
| 395428 ||  || — || September 20, 2011 || Kitt Peak || Spacewatch || — || align=right | 1.5 km || 
|-id=429 bgcolor=#E9E9E9
| 395429 ||  || — || March 10, 2005 || Mount Lemmon || Mount Lemmon Survey || — || align=right | 1.9 km || 
|-id=430 bgcolor=#E9E9E9
| 395430 ||  || — || January 29, 2009 || Mount Lemmon || Mount Lemmon Survey || — || align=right | 2.3 km || 
|-id=431 bgcolor=#d6d6d6
| 395431 ||  || — || March 11, 2008 || Kitt Peak || Spacewatch || — || align=right | 3.1 km || 
|-id=432 bgcolor=#fefefe
| 395432 ||  || — || August 28, 2011 || Siding Spring || SSS || — || align=right data-sort-value="0.92" | 920 m || 
|-id=433 bgcolor=#fefefe
| 395433 ||  || — || December 22, 2008 || Mount Lemmon || Mount Lemmon Survey || — || align=right data-sort-value="0.86" | 860 m || 
|-id=434 bgcolor=#E9E9E9
| 395434 ||  || — || September 8, 2011 || Kitt Peak || Spacewatch || — || align=right | 1.9 km || 
|-id=435 bgcolor=#fefefe
| 395435 ||  || — || October 2, 2000 || Kitt Peak || Spacewatch || NYS || align=right data-sort-value="0.66" | 660 m || 
|-id=436 bgcolor=#fefefe
| 395436 ||  || — || October 9, 2004 || Kitt Peak || Spacewatch || — || align=right data-sort-value="0.81" | 810 m || 
|-id=437 bgcolor=#E9E9E9
| 395437 ||  || — || October 17, 2007 || Anderson Mesa || LONEOS || — || align=right | 1.2 km || 
|-id=438 bgcolor=#E9E9E9
| 395438 ||  || — || August 21, 2006 || Kitt Peak || Spacewatch || AGN || align=right | 1.1 km || 
|-id=439 bgcolor=#E9E9E9
| 395439 ||  || — || September 29, 2011 || Mount Lemmon || Mount Lemmon Survey || WIT || align=right | 1.1 km || 
|-id=440 bgcolor=#d6d6d6
| 395440 ||  || — || September 22, 2011 || Kitt Peak || Spacewatch || EOS || align=right | 1.6 km || 
|-id=441 bgcolor=#d6d6d6
| 395441 ||  || — || November 19, 2006 || Kitt Peak || Spacewatch || EOS || align=right | 2.0 km || 
|-id=442 bgcolor=#E9E9E9
| 395442 ||  || — || September 8, 2011 || Kitt Peak || Spacewatch || — || align=right | 2.0 km || 
|-id=443 bgcolor=#fefefe
| 395443 ||  || — || September 28, 2011 || Mount Lemmon || Mount Lemmon Survey || MAS || align=right data-sort-value="0.71" | 710 m || 
|-id=444 bgcolor=#fefefe
| 395444 ||  || — || October 7, 2004 || Socorro || LINEAR || — || align=right data-sort-value="0.95" | 950 m || 
|-id=445 bgcolor=#E9E9E9
| 395445 ||  || — || September 8, 2011 || Kitt Peak || Spacewatch || — || align=right | 1.3 km || 
|-id=446 bgcolor=#E9E9E9
| 395446 ||  || — || October 15, 2007 || Kitt Peak || Spacewatch || — || align=right | 2.3 km || 
|-id=447 bgcolor=#E9E9E9
| 395447 ||  || — || October 6, 2007 || Kitt Peak || Spacewatch || — || align=right data-sort-value="0.90" | 900 m || 
|-id=448 bgcolor=#fefefe
| 395448 ||  || — || September 23, 2000 || Anderson Mesa || LONEOS || — || align=right data-sort-value="0.94" | 940 m || 
|-id=449 bgcolor=#E9E9E9
| 395449 ||  || — || March 8, 2005 || Mount Lemmon || Mount Lemmon Survey || — || align=right | 2.3 km || 
|-id=450 bgcolor=#E9E9E9
| 395450 ||  || — || June 1, 2005 || Kitt Peak || Spacewatch || — || align=right | 2.6 km || 
|-id=451 bgcolor=#d6d6d6
| 395451 ||  || — || January 15, 2008 || Kitt Peak || Spacewatch || KOR || align=right | 1.3 km || 
|-id=452 bgcolor=#E9E9E9
| 395452 ||  || — || November 19, 2007 || Kitt Peak || Spacewatch || — || align=right | 2.1 km || 
|-id=453 bgcolor=#E9E9E9
| 395453 ||  || — || April 12, 2005 || Mount Lemmon || Mount Lemmon Survey || — || align=right | 2.1 km || 
|-id=454 bgcolor=#d6d6d6
| 395454 ||  || — || March 26, 2009 || Kitt Peak || Spacewatch || EOS || align=right | 2.0 km || 
|-id=455 bgcolor=#fefefe
| 395455 ||  || — || October 11, 2004 || Kitt Peak || Spacewatch || NYS || align=right data-sort-value="0.83" | 830 m || 
|-id=456 bgcolor=#fefefe
| 395456 ||  || — || October 4, 2004 || Kitt Peak || Spacewatch || — || align=right data-sort-value="0.65" | 650 m || 
|-id=457 bgcolor=#d6d6d6
| 395457 ||  || — || September 19, 2006 || Anderson Mesa || LONEOS || NAE || align=right | 2.7 km || 
|-id=458 bgcolor=#fefefe
| 395458 ||  || — || August 13, 2007 || Anderson Mesa || LONEOS || — || align=right | 3.1 km || 
|-id=459 bgcolor=#fefefe
| 395459 ||  || — || August 16, 2007 || XuYi || PMO NEO || — || align=right | 1.0 km || 
|-id=460 bgcolor=#fefefe
| 395460 ||  || — || August 10, 2007 || Kitt Peak || Spacewatch || MAS || align=right data-sort-value="0.62" | 620 m || 
|-id=461 bgcolor=#E9E9E9
| 395461 ||  || — || September 14, 2007 || Kitt Peak || Spacewatch || — || align=right | 1.2 km || 
|-id=462 bgcolor=#d6d6d6
| 395462 ||  || — || November 17, 2006 || Kitt Peak || Spacewatch || EOS || align=right | 2.0 km || 
|-id=463 bgcolor=#E9E9E9
| 395463 ||  || — || December 15, 2007 || Kitt Peak || Spacewatch || AGN || align=right | 1.5 km || 
|-id=464 bgcolor=#fefefe
| 395464 ||  || — || September 4, 2007 || Catalina || CSS || — || align=right data-sort-value="0.85" | 850 m || 
|-id=465 bgcolor=#E9E9E9
| 395465 ||  || — || September 20, 2011 || Kitt Peak || Spacewatch || AGN || align=right | 1.3 km || 
|-id=466 bgcolor=#d6d6d6
| 395466 ||  || — || February 28, 2008 || Kitt Peak || Spacewatch || — || align=right | 3.2 km || 
|-id=467 bgcolor=#E9E9E9
| 395467 ||  || — || April 30, 2006 || Kitt Peak || Spacewatch || — || align=right data-sort-value="0.86" | 860 m || 
|-id=468 bgcolor=#E9E9E9
| 395468 ||  || — || February 20, 2009 || Kitt Peak || Spacewatch || — || align=right | 1.4 km || 
|-id=469 bgcolor=#E9E9E9
| 395469 ||  || — || September 19, 2006 || Kitt Peak || Spacewatch || AGN || align=right | 1.3 km || 
|-id=470 bgcolor=#d6d6d6
| 395470 ||  || — || November 23, 2006 || Kitt Peak || Spacewatch || EOS || align=right | 1.8 km || 
|-id=471 bgcolor=#fefefe
| 395471 ||  || — || October 6, 2000 || Kitt Peak || Spacewatch || — || align=right | 1.0 km || 
|-id=472 bgcolor=#d6d6d6
| 395472 ||  || — || February 8, 2008 || Kitt Peak || Spacewatch || — || align=right | 2.9 km || 
|-id=473 bgcolor=#d6d6d6
| 395473 ||  || — || November 2, 2006 || Mount Lemmon || Mount Lemmon Survey || EOS || align=right | 2.0 km || 
|-id=474 bgcolor=#E9E9E9
| 395474 ||  || — || March 27, 1995 || Kitt Peak || Spacewatch || — || align=right | 2.4 km || 
|-id=475 bgcolor=#E9E9E9
| 395475 ||  || — || August 28, 2006 || Catalina || CSS || AGN || align=right | 1.4 km || 
|-id=476 bgcolor=#E9E9E9
| 395476 ||  || — || March 1, 2010 || WISE || WISE || — || align=right | 3.5 km || 
|-id=477 bgcolor=#d6d6d6
| 395477 ||  || — || April 30, 2009 || Kitt Peak || Spacewatch || — || align=right | 3.7 km || 
|-id=478 bgcolor=#E9E9E9
| 395478 ||  || — || February 24, 2009 || Kitt Peak || Spacewatch || — || align=right | 2.2 km || 
|-id=479 bgcolor=#E9E9E9
| 395479 ||  || — || November 3, 2007 || Kitt Peak || Spacewatch || — || align=right data-sort-value="0.71" | 710 m || 
|-id=480 bgcolor=#d6d6d6
| 395480 ||  || — || October 12, 2006 || Kitt Peak || Spacewatch || EOS || align=right | 1.6 km || 
|-id=481 bgcolor=#d6d6d6
| 395481 ||  || — || October 1, 2005 || Catalina || CSS || — || align=right | 2.9 km || 
|-id=482 bgcolor=#E9E9E9
| 395482 ||  || — || May 9, 2006 || Mount Lemmon || Mount Lemmon Survey || — || align=right data-sort-value="0.85" | 850 m || 
|-id=483 bgcolor=#d6d6d6
| 395483 ||  || — || September 24, 2005 || Kitt Peak || Spacewatch || — || align=right | 2.8 km || 
|-id=484 bgcolor=#d6d6d6
| 395484 ||  || — || October 18, 2011 || Kitt Peak || Spacewatch || — || align=right | 3.7 km || 
|-id=485 bgcolor=#d6d6d6
| 395485 ||  || — || November 20, 2006 || Kitt Peak || Spacewatch || EOS || align=right | 2.3 km || 
|-id=486 bgcolor=#E9E9E9
| 395486 ||  || — || October 18, 2011 || XuYi || PMO NEO || — || align=right | 2.5 km || 
|-id=487 bgcolor=#E9E9E9
| 395487 ||  || — || December 18, 2003 || Socorro || LINEAR || — || align=right | 1.0 km || 
|-id=488 bgcolor=#E9E9E9
| 395488 ||  || — || May 31, 2006 || Mount Lemmon || Mount Lemmon Survey || — || align=right data-sort-value="0.98" | 980 m || 
|-id=489 bgcolor=#E9E9E9
| 395489 ||  || — || October 9, 1993 || Kitt Peak || Spacewatch || NEM || align=right | 1.9 km || 
|-id=490 bgcolor=#d6d6d6
| 395490 ||  || — || May 28, 2009 || Mount Lemmon || Mount Lemmon Survey || — || align=right | 3.2 km || 
|-id=491 bgcolor=#d6d6d6
| 395491 ||  || — || November 4, 2010 || Mount Lemmon || Mount Lemmon Survey || EOS || align=right | 2.7 km || 
|-id=492 bgcolor=#d6d6d6
| 395492 ||  || — || September 4, 2010 || Mount Lemmon || Mount Lemmon Survey || — || align=right | 3.1 km || 
|-id=493 bgcolor=#d6d6d6
| 395493 ||  || — || September 20, 2011 || Kitt Peak || Spacewatch || — || align=right | 3.1 km || 
|-id=494 bgcolor=#d6d6d6
| 395494 ||  || — || November 4, 2005 || Mount Lemmon || Mount Lemmon Survey || — || align=right | 3.8 km || 
|-id=495 bgcolor=#d6d6d6
| 395495 ||  || — || October 21, 2011 || Mount Lemmon || Mount Lemmon Survey || EOS || align=right | 2.4 km || 
|-id=496 bgcolor=#d6d6d6
| 395496 ||  || — || October 30, 2005 || Catalina || CSS || — || align=right | 5.3 km || 
|-id=497 bgcolor=#d6d6d6
| 395497 ||  || — || November 16, 2006 || Kitt Peak || Spacewatch || EOS || align=right | 1.8 km || 
|-id=498 bgcolor=#E9E9E9
| 395498 ||  || — || October 8, 2007 || Catalina || CSS || — || align=right | 1.7 km || 
|-id=499 bgcolor=#d6d6d6
| 395499 ||  || — || September 15, 2006 || Kitt Peak || Spacewatch || KOR || align=right | 1.3 km || 
|-id=500 bgcolor=#d6d6d6
| 395500 ||  || — || September 26, 2006 || Mount Lemmon || Mount Lemmon Survey || EOS || align=right | 1.9 km || 
|}

395501–395600 

|-bgcolor=#d6d6d6
| 395501 ||  || — || October 22, 2006 || Kitt Peak || Spacewatch || EOS || align=right | 1.6 km || 
|-id=502 bgcolor=#d6d6d6
| 395502 ||  || — || October 20, 2011 || Kitt Peak || Spacewatch || — || align=right | 2.4 km || 
|-id=503 bgcolor=#E9E9E9
| 395503 ||  || — || May 19, 2010 || WISE || WISE || — || align=right | 3.3 km || 
|-id=504 bgcolor=#d6d6d6
| 395504 ||  || — || October 20, 2011 || Kitt Peak || Spacewatch || — || align=right | 3.2 km || 
|-id=505 bgcolor=#d6d6d6
| 395505 ||  || — || December 20, 2001 || Kitt Peak || Spacewatch || — || align=right | 2.2 km || 
|-id=506 bgcolor=#E9E9E9
| 395506 ||  || — || November 23, 1997 || Kitt Peak || Spacewatch || MRX || align=right | 1.1 km || 
|-id=507 bgcolor=#d6d6d6
| 395507 ||  || — || September 25, 2006 || Kitt Peak || Spacewatch || KOR || align=right | 1.2 km || 
|-id=508 bgcolor=#E9E9E9
| 395508 ||  || — || September 21, 2011 || Kitt Peak || Spacewatch || — || align=right | 2.4 km || 
|-id=509 bgcolor=#fefefe
| 395509 ||  || — || August 13, 2007 || XuYi || PMO NEO || — || align=right data-sort-value="0.95" | 950 m || 
|-id=510 bgcolor=#E9E9E9
| 395510 ||  || — || November 8, 2007 || Kitt Peak || Spacewatch || — || align=right | 1.4 km || 
|-id=511 bgcolor=#E9E9E9
| 395511 ||  || — || October 8, 2007 || Mount Lemmon || Mount Lemmon Survey || — || align=right | 1.7 km || 
|-id=512 bgcolor=#E9E9E9
| 395512 ||  || — || September 26, 2011 || Kitt Peak || Spacewatch || AGN || align=right | 1.1 km || 
|-id=513 bgcolor=#E9E9E9
| 395513 ||  || — || May 1, 2006 || Kitt Peak || Spacewatch || — || align=right data-sort-value="0.90" | 900 m || 
|-id=514 bgcolor=#E9E9E9
| 395514 ||  || — || February 24, 2009 || Kitt Peak || Spacewatch || — || align=right | 2.2 km || 
|-id=515 bgcolor=#fefefe
| 395515 ||  || — || August 16, 2007 || XuYi || PMO NEO || — || align=right | 1.3 km || 
|-id=516 bgcolor=#E9E9E9
| 395516 ||  || — || October 20, 2011 || Kitt Peak || Spacewatch || — || align=right | 1.6 km || 
|-id=517 bgcolor=#E9E9E9
| 395517 ||  || — || July 5, 2010 || Mount Lemmon || Mount Lemmon Survey || — || align=right | 2.5 km || 
|-id=518 bgcolor=#E9E9E9
| 395518 ||  || — || September 20, 2011 || Mount Lemmon || Mount Lemmon Survey || — || align=right | 2.2 km || 
|-id=519 bgcolor=#E9E9E9
| 395519 ||  || — || November 8, 2007 || Mount Lemmon || Mount Lemmon Survey || — || align=right | 2.0 km || 
|-id=520 bgcolor=#d6d6d6
| 395520 ||  || — || May 17, 2010 || WISE || WISE || EOS || align=right | 2.8 km || 
|-id=521 bgcolor=#E9E9E9
| 395521 ||  || — || November 11, 2002 || Kitt Peak || Spacewatch || — || align=right | 2.3 km || 
|-id=522 bgcolor=#d6d6d6
| 395522 ||  || — || March 6, 2008 || Mount Lemmon || Mount Lemmon Survey || VER || align=right | 2.7 km || 
|-id=523 bgcolor=#d6d6d6
| 395523 ||  || — || September 29, 2005 || Kitt Peak || Spacewatch || VER || align=right | 2.7 km || 
|-id=524 bgcolor=#d6d6d6
| 395524 ||  || — || May 28, 2009 || Mount Lemmon || Mount Lemmon Survey || — || align=right | 3.2 km || 
|-id=525 bgcolor=#d6d6d6
| 395525 ||  || — || November 17, 2006 || Kitt Peak || Spacewatch || — || align=right | 2.6 km || 
|-id=526 bgcolor=#d6d6d6
| 395526 ||  || — || October 5, 2000 || Prescott || P. G. Comba || — || align=right | 2.9 km || 
|-id=527 bgcolor=#E9E9E9
| 395527 ||  || — || October 15, 2007 || Mount Lemmon || Mount Lemmon Survey || AGN || align=right | 1.4 km || 
|-id=528 bgcolor=#E9E9E9
| 395528 ||  || — || September 25, 2006 || Anderson Mesa || LONEOS || NEM || align=right | 2.7 km || 
|-id=529 bgcolor=#d6d6d6
| 395529 ||  || — || October 27, 2005 || Mount Lemmon || Mount Lemmon Survey || — || align=right | 3.0 km || 
|-id=530 bgcolor=#d6d6d6
| 395530 ||  || — || April 20, 1993 || Kitt Peak || Spacewatch || — || align=right | 3.7 km || 
|-id=531 bgcolor=#d6d6d6
| 395531 ||  || — || November 12, 2006 || Mount Lemmon || Mount Lemmon Survey || — || align=right | 2.5 km || 
|-id=532 bgcolor=#d6d6d6
| 395532 ||  || — || April 26, 2003 || Kitt Peak || Spacewatch || — || align=right | 3.6 km || 
|-id=533 bgcolor=#d6d6d6
| 395533 ||  || — || October 18, 2011 || Kitt Peak || Spacewatch || EOS || align=right | 1.8 km || 
|-id=534 bgcolor=#d6d6d6
| 395534 ||  || — || November 19, 2006 || Kitt Peak || Spacewatch || — || align=right | 2.3 km || 
|-id=535 bgcolor=#d6d6d6
| 395535 ||  || — || September 26, 2000 || Anderson Mesa || LONEOS || — || align=right | 3.2 km || 
|-id=536 bgcolor=#E9E9E9
| 395536 ||  || — || December 5, 2007 || Mount Lemmon || Mount Lemmon Survey || — || align=right data-sort-value="0.98" | 980 m || 
|-id=537 bgcolor=#d6d6d6
| 395537 ||  || — || April 19, 2009 || Mount Lemmon || Mount Lemmon Survey || — || align=right | 3.4 km || 
|-id=538 bgcolor=#E9E9E9
| 395538 ||  || — || November 19, 2007 || Mount Lemmon || Mount Lemmon Survey || — || align=right | 2.6 km || 
|-id=539 bgcolor=#E9E9E9
| 395539 ||  || — || May 15, 2005 || Mount Lemmon || Mount Lemmon Survey || — || align=right | 2.8 km || 
|-id=540 bgcolor=#d6d6d6
| 395540 ||  || — || May 23, 2010 || WISE || WISE || — || align=right | 3.8 km || 
|-id=541 bgcolor=#d6d6d6
| 395541 ||  || — || March 3, 2008 || Mount Lemmon || Mount Lemmon Survey || EOS || align=right | 2.3 km || 
|-id=542 bgcolor=#E9E9E9
| 395542 ||  || — || May 7, 2010 || Mount Lemmon || Mount Lemmon Survey || — || align=right data-sort-value="0.88" | 880 m || 
|-id=543 bgcolor=#fefefe
| 395543 ||  || — || March 13, 2010 || Kitt Peak || Spacewatch || — || align=right data-sort-value="0.80" | 800 m || 
|-id=544 bgcolor=#d6d6d6
| 395544 ||  || — || October 5, 1996 || Kitt Peak || Spacewatch || — || align=right | 2.4 km || 
|-id=545 bgcolor=#d6d6d6
| 395545 ||  || — || December 20, 2007 || Mount Lemmon || Mount Lemmon Survey || — || align=right | 2.5 km || 
|-id=546 bgcolor=#d6d6d6
| 395546 ||  || — || May 1, 2009 || Mount Lemmon || Mount Lemmon Survey || — || align=right | 3.1 km || 
|-id=547 bgcolor=#E9E9E9
| 395547 ||  || — || April 24, 2006 || Kitt Peak || Spacewatch || — || align=right | 2.1 km || 
|-id=548 bgcolor=#E9E9E9
| 395548 ||  || — || September 15, 2006 || Kitt Peak || Spacewatch || AGN || align=right | 1.1 km || 
|-id=549 bgcolor=#E9E9E9
| 395549 ||  || — || March 1, 2009 || Kitt Peak || Spacewatch || — || align=right | 2.4 km || 
|-id=550 bgcolor=#E9E9E9
| 395550 ||  || — || March 16, 2005 || Mount Lemmon || Mount Lemmon Survey || — || align=right | 2.6 km || 
|-id=551 bgcolor=#d6d6d6
| 395551 ||  || — || October 1, 2011 || Kitt Peak || Spacewatch || — || align=right | 4.4 km || 
|-id=552 bgcolor=#E9E9E9
| 395552 ||  || — || October 4, 2002 || Socorro || LINEAR || — || align=right | 1.8 km || 
|-id=553 bgcolor=#d6d6d6
| 395553 ||  || — || November 14, 2006 || Mount Lemmon || Mount Lemmon Survey || — || align=right | 3.5 km || 
|-id=554 bgcolor=#E9E9E9
| 395554 ||  || — || January 13, 2004 || Kitt Peak || Spacewatch || (5) || align=right | 1.1 km || 
|-id=555 bgcolor=#d6d6d6
| 395555 ||  || — || September 29, 2011 || Mount Lemmon || Mount Lemmon Survey || — || align=right | 3.2 km || 
|-id=556 bgcolor=#d6d6d6
| 395556 ||  || — || October 25, 2011 || Kitt Peak || Spacewatch || — || align=right | 3.0 km || 
|-id=557 bgcolor=#fefefe
| 395557 ||  || — || September 21, 2004 || Anderson Mesa || LONEOS || — || align=right data-sort-value="0.89" | 890 m || 
|-id=558 bgcolor=#fefefe
| 395558 ||  || — || December 29, 2008 || Mount Lemmon || Mount Lemmon Survey || — || align=right | 1.1 km || 
|-id=559 bgcolor=#E9E9E9
| 395559 ||  || — || August 29, 2006 || Kitt Peak || Spacewatch || PAD || align=right | 1.4 km || 
|-id=560 bgcolor=#d6d6d6
| 395560 ||  || — || October 21, 2006 || Kitt Peak || Spacewatch || EOS || align=right | 1.6 km || 
|-id=561 bgcolor=#E9E9E9
| 395561 ||  || — || August 28, 2006 || Kitt Peak || Spacewatch || — || align=right | 2.3 km || 
|-id=562 bgcolor=#E9E9E9
| 395562 ||  || — || September 23, 2011 || Kitt Peak || Spacewatch || — || align=right | 2.3 km || 
|-id=563 bgcolor=#E9E9E9
| 395563 ||  || — || March 22, 2009 || Catalina || CSS || — || align=right | 2.4 km || 
|-id=564 bgcolor=#E9E9E9
| 395564 ||  || — || March 10, 2005 || Mount Lemmon || Mount Lemmon Survey || — || align=right | 1.7 km || 
|-id=565 bgcolor=#d6d6d6
| 395565 ||  || — || March 6, 2008 || Mount Lemmon || Mount Lemmon Survey || — || align=right | 2.8 km || 
|-id=566 bgcolor=#E9E9E9
| 395566 ||  || — || March 29, 2009 || Kitt Peak || Spacewatch || AST || align=right | 1.6 km || 
|-id=567 bgcolor=#d6d6d6
| 395567 ||  || — || October 22, 2011 || Kitt Peak || Spacewatch || EOS || align=right | 2.5 km || 
|-id=568 bgcolor=#d6d6d6
| 395568 ||  || — || September 28, 2011 || Mount Lemmon || Mount Lemmon Survey || — || align=right | 3.9 km || 
|-id=569 bgcolor=#E9E9E9
| 395569 ||  || — || June 27, 2005 || Kitt Peak || Spacewatch || — || align=right | 2.4 km || 
|-id=570 bgcolor=#E9E9E9
| 395570 ||  || — || September 24, 2006 || Anderson Mesa || LONEOS || — || align=right | 3.1 km || 
|-id=571 bgcolor=#d6d6d6
| 395571 ||  || — || September 24, 2011 || Mount Lemmon || Mount Lemmon Survey || — || align=right | 3.5 km || 
|-id=572 bgcolor=#d6d6d6
| 395572 ||  || — || April 21, 2009 || Kitt Peak || Spacewatch || — || align=right | 3.2 km || 
|-id=573 bgcolor=#E9E9E9
| 395573 ||  || — || December 5, 2007 || Kitt Peak || Spacewatch || GEF || align=right | 1.5 km || 
|-id=574 bgcolor=#E9E9E9
| 395574 ||  || — || September 26, 2006 || Catalina || CSS || — || align=right | 2.3 km || 
|-id=575 bgcolor=#d6d6d6
| 395575 ||  || — || May 2, 2003 || Kitt Peak || Spacewatch || — || align=right | 4.0 km || 
|-id=576 bgcolor=#d6d6d6
| 395576 ||  || — || October 29, 2000 || Kitt Peak || Spacewatch || — || align=right | 3.1 km || 
|-id=577 bgcolor=#d6d6d6
| 395577 ||  || — || May 20, 2010 || WISE || WISE || — || align=right | 4.9 km || 
|-id=578 bgcolor=#d6d6d6
| 395578 ||  || — || November 10, 2006 || Kitt Peak || Spacewatch || EOS || align=right | 2.6 km || 
|-id=579 bgcolor=#d6d6d6
| 395579 ||  || — || October 28, 2005 || Mount Lemmon || Mount Lemmon Survey || — || align=right | 3.3 km || 
|-id=580 bgcolor=#d6d6d6
| 395580 ||  || — || November 10, 2006 || Kitt Peak || Spacewatch || — || align=right | 2.2 km || 
|-id=581 bgcolor=#d6d6d6
| 395581 ||  || — || September 24, 2011 || Mount Lemmon || Mount Lemmon Survey || TEL || align=right | 1.6 km || 
|-id=582 bgcolor=#E9E9E9
| 395582 ||  || — || September 24, 1998 || Anderson Mesa || LONEOS || — || align=right | 2.0 km || 
|-id=583 bgcolor=#d6d6d6
| 395583 ||  || — || December 14, 2006 || Kitt Peak || Spacewatch || — || align=right | 3.3 km || 
|-id=584 bgcolor=#d6d6d6
| 395584 ||  || — || May 19, 2010 || WISE || WISE || ARM || align=right | 4.2 km || 
|-id=585 bgcolor=#E9E9E9
| 395585 ||  || — || September 15, 2006 || Kitt Peak || Spacewatch || AGN || align=right | 1.1 km || 
|-id=586 bgcolor=#E9E9E9
| 395586 ||  || — || March 22, 2001 || Kitt Peak || Spacewatch || — || align=right | 2.0 km || 
|-id=587 bgcolor=#E9E9E9
| 395587 ||  || — || November 5, 2007 || Kitt Peak || Spacewatch || KON || align=right | 2.6 km || 
|-id=588 bgcolor=#E9E9E9
| 395588 ||  || — || September 20, 2003 || Campo Imperatore || CINEOS || — || align=right | 1.1 km || 
|-id=589 bgcolor=#d6d6d6
| 395589 ||  || — || September 29, 2011 || Mount Lemmon || Mount Lemmon Survey || — || align=right | 3.2 km || 
|-id=590 bgcolor=#E9E9E9
| 395590 ||  || — || November 8, 2007 || Kitt Peak || Spacewatch || — || align=right data-sort-value="0.90" | 900 m || 
|-id=591 bgcolor=#d6d6d6
| 395591 ||  || — || November 7, 2007 || Mount Lemmon || Mount Lemmon Survey || BRA || align=right | 1.7 km || 
|-id=592 bgcolor=#E9E9E9
| 395592 ||  || — || September 28, 2006 || Kitt Peak || Spacewatch || AGN || align=right | 1.4 km || 
|-id=593 bgcolor=#d6d6d6
| 395593 ||  || — || November 1, 2006 || Mount Lemmon || Mount Lemmon Survey || NAE || align=right | 1.9 km || 
|-id=594 bgcolor=#E9E9E9
| 395594 ||  || — || September 18, 2006 || Kitt Peak || Spacewatch || — || align=right | 2.5 km || 
|-id=595 bgcolor=#E9E9E9
| 395595 ||  || — || May 15, 2005 || Mount Lemmon || Mount Lemmon Survey || — || align=right | 2.2 km || 
|-id=596 bgcolor=#d6d6d6
| 395596 ||  || — || October 25, 2000 || Socorro || LINEAR || — || align=right | 3.6 km || 
|-id=597 bgcolor=#d6d6d6
| 395597 ||  || — || June 8, 2005 || Kitt Peak || Spacewatch || — || align=right | 2.2 km || 
|-id=598 bgcolor=#E9E9E9
| 395598 ||  || — || October 8, 2007 || Kitt Peak || Spacewatch || — || align=right | 1.6 km || 
|-id=599 bgcolor=#E9E9E9
| 395599 ||  || — || August 19, 2006 || Kitt Peak || Spacewatch || — || align=right | 2.1 km || 
|-id=600 bgcolor=#d6d6d6
| 395600 ||  || — || March 29, 2008 || Catalina || CSS || — || align=right | 3.2 km || 
|}

395601–395700 

|-bgcolor=#d6d6d6
| 395601 ||  || — || October 17, 2006 || Kitt Peak || Spacewatch || EOS || align=right | 1.6 km || 
|-id=602 bgcolor=#d6d6d6
| 395602 ||  || — || December 15, 2006 || Kitt Peak || Spacewatch || — || align=right | 3.4 km || 
|-id=603 bgcolor=#d6d6d6
| 395603 ||  || — || February 2, 2008 || Kitt Peak || Spacewatch || — || align=right | 2.3 km || 
|-id=604 bgcolor=#E9E9E9
| 395604 ||  || — || November 16, 1998 || Kitt Peak || Spacewatch || — || align=right | 1.7 km || 
|-id=605 bgcolor=#E9E9E9
| 395605 ||  || — || August 19, 2006 || Kitt Peak || Spacewatch || — || align=right | 1.9 km || 
|-id=606 bgcolor=#d6d6d6
| 395606 ||  || — || September 26, 2011 || Kitt Peak || Spacewatch || VER || align=right | 2.7 km || 
|-id=607 bgcolor=#d6d6d6
| 395607 ||  || — || September 27, 2000 || Kitt Peak || Spacewatch || EOS || align=right | 1.9 km || 
|-id=608 bgcolor=#fefefe
| 395608 ||  || — || July 19, 2007 || Siding Spring || SSS || — || align=right | 1.1 km || 
|-id=609 bgcolor=#d6d6d6
| 395609 ||  || — || October 1, 2011 || Mount Lemmon || Mount Lemmon Survey || EOS || align=right | 2.3 km || 
|-id=610 bgcolor=#d6d6d6
| 395610 ||  || — || May 24, 2010 || WISE || WISE || — || align=right | 3.3 km || 
|-id=611 bgcolor=#E9E9E9
| 395611 ||  || — || August 27, 2006 || Kitt Peak || Spacewatch || — || align=right | 2.3 km || 
|-id=612 bgcolor=#E9E9E9
| 395612 ||  || — || November 19, 2007 || Mount Lemmon || Mount Lemmon Survey || — || align=right | 2.1 km || 
|-id=613 bgcolor=#d6d6d6
| 395613 ||  || — || October 22, 2011 || Kitt Peak || Spacewatch || — || align=right | 3.4 km || 
|-id=614 bgcolor=#E9E9E9
| 395614 ||  || — || August 19, 2006 || Kitt Peak || Spacewatch || WIT || align=right data-sort-value="0.90" | 900 m || 
|-id=615 bgcolor=#d6d6d6
| 395615 ||  || — || February 6, 2008 || Catalina || CSS || — || align=right | 2.9 km || 
|-id=616 bgcolor=#d6d6d6
| 395616 ||  || — || April 27, 2009 || Mount Lemmon || Mount Lemmon Survey || EOS || align=right | 2.1 km || 
|-id=617 bgcolor=#d6d6d6
| 395617 ||  || — || April 29, 2009 || Mount Lemmon || Mount Lemmon Survey || EOS || align=right | 2.3 km || 
|-id=618 bgcolor=#d6d6d6
| 395618 ||  || — || February 29, 2008 || Mount Lemmon || Mount Lemmon Survey || — || align=right | 2.8 km || 
|-id=619 bgcolor=#d6d6d6
| 395619 ||  || — || October 4, 1994 || Kitt Peak || Spacewatch || — || align=right | 2.5 km || 
|-id=620 bgcolor=#d6d6d6
| 395620 ||  || — || March 3, 2008 || Catalina || CSS || — || align=right | 4.1 km || 
|-id=621 bgcolor=#d6d6d6
| 395621 ||  || — || April 30, 2009 || Mount Lemmon || Mount Lemmon Survey || — || align=right | 3.5 km || 
|-id=622 bgcolor=#d6d6d6
| 395622 ||  || — || December 13, 2006 || Kitt Peak || Spacewatch || HYG || align=right | 2.9 km || 
|-id=623 bgcolor=#d6d6d6
| 395623 ||  || — || July 4, 2005 || Mount Lemmon || Mount Lemmon Survey || — || align=right | 2.2 km || 
|-id=624 bgcolor=#d6d6d6
| 395624 ||  || — || December 9, 2006 || Kitt Peak || Spacewatch || — || align=right | 5.7 km || 
|-id=625 bgcolor=#fefefe
| 395625 ||  || — || April 4, 2003 || Kitt Peak || Spacewatch || — || align=right data-sort-value="0.81" | 810 m || 
|-id=626 bgcolor=#E9E9E9
| 395626 ||  || — || April 4, 2005 || Catalina || CSS || — || align=right | 1.8 km || 
|-id=627 bgcolor=#E9E9E9
| 395627 ||  || — || September 9, 2007 || Mount Lemmon || Mount Lemmon Survey || — || align=right | 1.1 km || 
|-id=628 bgcolor=#d6d6d6
| 395628 ||  || — || January 20, 2008 || Kitt Peak || Spacewatch || — || align=right | 3.2 km || 
|-id=629 bgcolor=#d6d6d6
| 395629 ||  || — || May 24, 2010 || WISE || WISE || — || align=right | 3.8 km || 
|-id=630 bgcolor=#d6d6d6
| 395630 ||  || — || October 7, 2005 || Mount Lemmon || Mount Lemmon Survey || EOS || align=right | 1.8 km || 
|-id=631 bgcolor=#E9E9E9
| 395631 ||  || — || May 7, 2010 || Mount Lemmon || Mount Lemmon Survey || ADE || align=right | 2.5 km || 
|-id=632 bgcolor=#E9E9E9
| 395632 ||  || — || May 3, 2005 || Kitt Peak || Spacewatch || — || align=right | 2.1 km || 
|-id=633 bgcolor=#d6d6d6
| 395633 ||  || — || November 15, 1995 || Kitt Peak || Spacewatch || — || align=right | 2.4 km || 
|-id=634 bgcolor=#d6d6d6
| 395634 ||  || — || May 11, 2010 || WISE || WISE || — || align=right | 3.2 km || 
|-id=635 bgcolor=#d6d6d6
| 395635 ||  || — || November 14, 1995 || Kitt Peak || Spacewatch || — || align=right | 2.3 km || 
|-id=636 bgcolor=#E9E9E9
| 395636 ||  || — || August 28, 2006 || Siding Spring || SSS || — || align=right | 3.0 km || 
|-id=637 bgcolor=#d6d6d6
| 395637 ||  || — || February 28, 2008 || Mount Lemmon || Mount Lemmon Survey || — || align=right | 2.7 km || 
|-id=638 bgcolor=#d6d6d6
| 395638 ||  || — || September 30, 2006 || Mount Lemmon || Mount Lemmon Survey || — || align=right | 2.1 km || 
|-id=639 bgcolor=#d6d6d6
| 395639 ||  || — || January 30, 2008 || Mount Lemmon || Mount Lemmon Survey || — || align=right | 2.3 km || 
|-id=640 bgcolor=#d6d6d6
| 395640 ||  || — || October 21, 2006 || Kitt Peak || Spacewatch || KOR || align=right | 1.4 km || 
|-id=641 bgcolor=#E9E9E9
| 395641 ||  || — || April 17, 2005 || Kitt Peak || Spacewatch || — || align=right | 1.8 km || 
|-id=642 bgcolor=#d6d6d6
| 395642 ||  || — || January 8, 2002 || Kitt Peak || Spacewatch || — || align=right | 2.3 km || 
|-id=643 bgcolor=#d6d6d6
| 395643 ||  || — || November 16, 2006 || Kitt Peak || Spacewatch || EOS || align=right | 1.9 km || 
|-id=644 bgcolor=#d6d6d6
| 395644 ||  || — || March 12, 2002 || Kitt Peak || Spacewatch || THM || align=right | 2.4 km || 
|-id=645 bgcolor=#d6d6d6
| 395645 ||  || — || October 24, 2000 || Socorro || LINEAR || TIR || align=right | 3.2 km || 
|-id=646 bgcolor=#E9E9E9
| 395646 ||  || — || November 22, 1997 || Kitt Peak || Spacewatch || — || align=right | 2.5 km || 
|-id=647 bgcolor=#E9E9E9
| 395647 ||  || — || October 2, 2006 || Mount Lemmon || Mount Lemmon Survey || — || align=right | 2.6 km || 
|-id=648 bgcolor=#d6d6d6
| 395648 ||  || — || May 21, 2010 || WISE || WISE || — || align=right | 3.0 km || 
|-id=649 bgcolor=#d6d6d6
| 395649 ||  || — || September 25, 2005 || Kitt Peak || Spacewatch || — || align=right | 3.2 km || 
|-id=650 bgcolor=#d6d6d6
| 395650 ||  || — || March 1, 2008 || Kitt Peak || Spacewatch || EOS || align=right | 1.7 km || 
|-id=651 bgcolor=#E9E9E9
| 395651 ||  || — || June 17, 2010 || Mount Lemmon || Mount Lemmon Survey || — || align=right | 2.2 km || 
|-id=652 bgcolor=#E9E9E9
| 395652 ||  || — || December 17, 2003 || Kitt Peak || Spacewatch || (5) || align=right | 1.1 km || 
|-id=653 bgcolor=#E9E9E9
| 395653 ||  || — || September 25, 2006 || Catalina || CSS || — || align=right | 3.0 km || 
|-id=654 bgcolor=#d6d6d6
| 395654 ||  || — || May 31, 2010 || WISE || WISE || — || align=right | 3.7 km || 
|-id=655 bgcolor=#E9E9E9
| 395655 ||  || — || October 15, 2007 || Mount Lemmon || Mount Lemmon Survey || — || align=right data-sort-value="0.98" | 980 m || 
|-id=656 bgcolor=#d6d6d6
| 395656 ||  || — || March 4, 2008 || Kitt Peak || Spacewatch || HYG || align=right | 3.1 km || 
|-id=657 bgcolor=#d6d6d6
| 395657 ||  || — || December 20, 2006 || Mount Lemmon || Mount Lemmon Survey || — || align=right | 3.9 km || 
|-id=658 bgcolor=#d6d6d6
| 395658 ||  || — || November 8, 2005 || Socorro || LINEAR || — || align=right | 5.8 km || 
|-id=659 bgcolor=#d6d6d6
| 395659 ||  || — || November 9, 2005 || Catalina || CSS || — || align=right | 3.9 km || 
|-id=660 bgcolor=#d6d6d6
| 395660 ||  || — || November 16, 2006 || Kitt Peak || Spacewatch || EOS || align=right | 1.7 km || 
|-id=661 bgcolor=#d6d6d6
| 395661 ||  || — || October 18, 2006 || Kitt Peak || Spacewatch || KOR || align=right | 1.5 km || 
|-id=662 bgcolor=#d6d6d6
| 395662 ||  || — || March 1, 2008 || Kitt Peak || Spacewatch || — || align=right | 2.8 km || 
|-id=663 bgcolor=#E9E9E9
| 395663 ||  || — || April 1, 2005 || Kitt Peak || Spacewatch || — || align=right | 1.7 km || 
|-id=664 bgcolor=#d6d6d6
| 395664 ||  || — || August 30, 2005 || Kitt Peak || Spacewatch || — || align=right | 2.3 km || 
|-id=665 bgcolor=#d6d6d6
| 395665 ||  || — || February 18, 2008 || Mount Lemmon || Mount Lemmon Survey || EOS || align=right | 2.2 km || 
|-id=666 bgcolor=#d6d6d6
| 395666 ||  || — || October 3, 2005 || Catalina || CSS || — || align=right | 3.3 km || 
|-id=667 bgcolor=#d6d6d6
| 395667 ||  || — || March 8, 2008 || Kitt Peak || Spacewatch || — || align=right | 3.5 km || 
|-id=668 bgcolor=#E9E9E9
| 395668 ||  || — || September 17, 2006 || Kitt Peak || Spacewatch || — || align=right | 2.4 km || 
|-id=669 bgcolor=#d6d6d6
| 395669 ||  || — || November 18, 2011 || Mount Lemmon || Mount Lemmon Survey || — || align=right | 4.8 km || 
|-id=670 bgcolor=#E9E9E9
| 395670 ||  || — || March 5, 1997 || Kitt Peak || Spacewatch || — || align=right | 1.4 km || 
|-id=671 bgcolor=#d6d6d6
| 395671 ||  || — || October 2, 2005 || Siding Spring || SSS || EUP || align=right | 5.5 km || 
|-id=672 bgcolor=#C2FFFF
| 395672 ||  || — || May 8, 2005 || Kitt Peak || Spacewatch || L4 || align=right | 14 km || 
|-id=673 bgcolor=#d6d6d6
| 395673 ||  || — || December 22, 2006 || Kitt Peak || Spacewatch || EOS || align=right | 2.1 km || 
|-id=674 bgcolor=#E9E9E9
| 395674 ||  || — || September 17, 2006 || Anderson Mesa || LONEOS || — || align=right | 2.5 km || 
|-id=675 bgcolor=#E9E9E9
| 395675 ||  || — || January 1, 2008 || Kitt Peak || Spacewatch || — || align=right | 2.5 km || 
|-id=676 bgcolor=#d6d6d6
| 395676 ||  || — || December 13, 2006 || Mount Lemmon || Mount Lemmon Survey || — || align=right | 2.7 km || 
|-id=677 bgcolor=#d6d6d6
| 395677 ||  || — || March 6, 2008 || Mount Lemmon || Mount Lemmon Survey || — || align=right | 3.4 km || 
|-id=678 bgcolor=#E9E9E9
| 395678 ||  || — || March 18, 2009 || Kitt Peak || Spacewatch || — || align=right | 2.0 km || 
|-id=679 bgcolor=#E9E9E9
| 395679 ||  || — || March 1, 2009 || Kitt Peak || Spacewatch || — || align=right | 1.8 km || 
|-id=680 bgcolor=#d6d6d6
| 395680 ||  || — || December 13, 2006 || Kitt Peak || Spacewatch || EOS || align=right | 2.1 km || 
|-id=681 bgcolor=#d6d6d6
| 395681 ||  || — || October 7, 2005 || Mount Lemmon || Mount Lemmon Survey || — || align=right | 3.1 km || 
|-id=682 bgcolor=#d6d6d6
| 395682 ||  || — || April 4, 2003 || Kitt Peak || Spacewatch || — || align=right | 3.3 km || 
|-id=683 bgcolor=#d6d6d6
| 395683 ||  || — || May 15, 2009 || Kitt Peak || Spacewatch || EOS || align=right | 2.1 km || 
|-id=684 bgcolor=#d6d6d6
| 395684 ||  || — || September 23, 2005 || Kitt Peak || Spacewatch || VER || align=right | 2.6 km || 
|-id=685 bgcolor=#d6d6d6
| 395685 ||  || — || May 18, 2010 || WISE || WISE || — || align=right | 4.1 km || 
|-id=686 bgcolor=#d6d6d6
| 395686 ||  || — || November 11, 1999 || Kitt Peak || Spacewatch || — || align=right | 4.5 km || 
|-id=687 bgcolor=#d6d6d6
| 395687 ||  || — || October 30, 2005 || Kitt Peak || Spacewatch || HYG || align=right | 3.1 km || 
|-id=688 bgcolor=#d6d6d6
| 395688 ||  || — || July 31, 2010 || WISE || WISE || EUP || align=right | 6.8 km || 
|-id=689 bgcolor=#d6d6d6
| 395689 ||  || — || December 1, 2005 || Kitt Peak || Spacewatch || VER || align=right | 2.7 km || 
|-id=690 bgcolor=#d6d6d6
| 395690 ||  || — || October 7, 2005 || Catalina || CSS || — || align=right | 3.7 km || 
|-id=691 bgcolor=#d6d6d6
| 395691 ||  || — || July 14, 2010 || WISE || WISE || — || align=right | 3.1 km || 
|-id=692 bgcolor=#C2FFFF
| 395692 ||  || — || November 12, 2010 || Mount Lemmon || Mount Lemmon Survey || L4 || align=right | 8.5 km || 
|-id=693 bgcolor=#d6d6d6
| 395693 ||  || — || July 2, 2010 || WISE || WISE || — || align=right | 7.2 km || 
|-id=694 bgcolor=#d6d6d6
| 395694 ||  || — || October 29, 2010 || Mount Lemmon || Mount Lemmon Survey || 3:2 || align=right | 5.9 km || 
|-id=695 bgcolor=#C2FFFF
| 395695 ||  || — || October 22, 2009 || Mount Lemmon || Mount Lemmon Survey || L4 || align=right | 11 km || 
|-id=696 bgcolor=#C2FFFF
| 395696 ||  || — || November 15, 2009 || Catalina || CSS || L4 || align=right | 9.6 km || 
|-id=697 bgcolor=#d6d6d6
| 395697 ||  || — || December 26, 2005 || Kitt Peak || Spacewatch || VER || align=right | 4.3 km || 
|-id=698 bgcolor=#d6d6d6
| 395698 ||  || — || January 8, 2002 || Socorro || LINEAR || — || align=right | 2.3 km || 
|-id=699 bgcolor=#C7FF8F
| 395699 ||  || — || January 1, 2008 || Kitt Peak || Spacewatch || centaurcritical || align=right | 32 km || 
|-id=700 bgcolor=#E9E9E9
| 395700 ||  || — || November 24, 2003 || Socorro || LINEAR || — || align=right | 3.3 km || 
|}

395701–395800 

|-bgcolor=#E9E9E9
| 395701 ||  || — || September 30, 2008 || Mount Lemmon || Mount Lemmon Survey || — || align=right | 1.1 km || 
|-id=702 bgcolor=#E9E9E9
| 395702 ||  || — || October 10, 1999 || Socorro || LINEAR || — || align=right | 1.8 km || 
|-id=703 bgcolor=#FA8072
| 395703 ||  || — || October 3, 1999 || Catalina || CSS || H || align=right data-sort-value="0.80" | 800 m || 
|-id=704 bgcolor=#fefefe
| 395704 ||  || — || March 26, 2007 || Kitt Peak || Spacewatch || — || align=right data-sort-value="0.98" | 980 m || 
|-id=705 bgcolor=#fefefe
| 395705 ||  || — || May 10, 2007 || Mount Lemmon || Mount Lemmon Survey || — || align=right | 1.5 km || 
|-id=706 bgcolor=#fefefe
| 395706 ||  || — || August 30, 2008 || Socorro || LINEAR || — || align=right | 1.1 km || 
|-id=707 bgcolor=#FA8072
| 395707 ||  || — || September 14, 2004 || Socorro || LINEAR || H || align=right data-sort-value="0.70" | 700 m || 
|-id=708 bgcolor=#E9E9E9
| 395708 ||  || — || November 23, 2008 || Catalina || CSS || — || align=right | 1.9 km || 
|-id=709 bgcolor=#fefefe
| 395709 ||  || — || November 12, 1999 || Socorro || LINEAR || H || align=right data-sort-value="0.94" | 940 m || 
|-id=710 bgcolor=#fefefe
| 395710 ||  || — || July 30, 2008 || Catalina || CSS || — || align=right | 1.2 km || 
|-id=711 bgcolor=#E9E9E9
| 395711 ||  || — || March 9, 2005 || Kitt Peak || Spacewatch || CLO || align=right | 2.0 km || 
|-id=712 bgcolor=#E9E9E9
| 395712 ||  || — || September 29, 2008 || Mount Lemmon || Mount Lemmon Survey || — || align=right | 1.7 km || 
|-id=713 bgcolor=#fefefe
| 395713 ||  || — || March 16, 2004 || Kitt Peak || Spacewatch || — || align=right data-sort-value="0.61" | 610 m || 
|-id=714 bgcolor=#fefefe
| 395714 ||  || — || December 6, 2002 || Socorro || LINEAR || — || align=right data-sort-value="0.74" | 740 m || 
|-id=715 bgcolor=#fefefe
| 395715 ||  || — || April 27, 1998 || Kitt Peak || Spacewatch || H || align=right data-sort-value="0.79" | 790 m || 
|-id=716 bgcolor=#fefefe
| 395716 ||  || — || September 25, 2005 || Kitt Peak || Spacewatch || — || align=right data-sort-value="0.65" | 650 m || 
|-id=717 bgcolor=#fefefe
| 395717 ||  || — || November 8, 2009 || Mount Lemmon || Mount Lemmon Survey || — || align=right data-sort-value="0.87" | 870 m || 
|-id=718 bgcolor=#E9E9E9
| 395718 ||  || — || December 4, 2008 || Kitt Peak || Spacewatch || AGN || align=right | 1.6 km || 
|-id=719 bgcolor=#E9E9E9
| 395719 ||  || — || January 17, 2005 || Kitt Peak || Spacewatch || — || align=right data-sort-value="0.98" | 980 m || 
|-id=720 bgcolor=#fefefe
| 395720 ||  || — || November 20, 2001 || Socorro || LINEAR || — || align=right data-sort-value="0.69" | 690 m || 
|-id=721 bgcolor=#E9E9E9
| 395721 ||  || — || April 14, 2010 || Mount Lemmon || Mount Lemmon Survey || — || align=right | 3.2 km || 
|-id=722 bgcolor=#fefefe
| 395722 ||  || — || March 17, 2004 || Kitt Peak || Spacewatch || — || align=right | 1.4 km || 
|-id=723 bgcolor=#d6d6d6
| 395723 ||  || — || June 11, 2011 || Mount Lemmon || Mount Lemmon Survey || EOS || align=right | 2.2 km || 
|-id=724 bgcolor=#fefefe
| 395724 ||  || — || April 15, 2008 || Mount Lemmon || Mount Lemmon Survey || H || align=right data-sort-value="0.62" | 620 m || 
|-id=725 bgcolor=#E9E9E9
| 395725 ||  || — || March 18, 2010 || Mount Lemmon || Mount Lemmon Survey || — || align=right | 1.7 km || 
|-id=726 bgcolor=#fefefe
| 395726 ||  || — || March 12, 2007 || Mount Lemmon || Mount Lemmon Survey || — || align=right data-sort-value="0.81" | 810 m || 
|-id=727 bgcolor=#fefefe
| 395727 ||  || — || September 15, 2012 || Kitt Peak || Spacewatch || — || align=right data-sort-value="0.79" | 790 m || 
|-id=728 bgcolor=#fefefe
| 395728 ||  || — || February 27, 2007 || Kitt Peak || Spacewatch || — || align=right data-sort-value="0.59" | 590 m || 
|-id=729 bgcolor=#E9E9E9
| 395729 ||  || — || November 19, 2003 || Kitt Peak || Spacewatch || — || align=right | 1.8 km || 
|-id=730 bgcolor=#E9E9E9
| 395730 ||  || — || September 29, 2008 || Mount Lemmon || Mount Lemmon Survey || — || align=right | 1.5 km || 
|-id=731 bgcolor=#E9E9E9
| 395731 ||  || — || March 10, 2005 || Catalina || CSS || — || align=right | 2.1 km || 
|-id=732 bgcolor=#fefefe
| 395732 ||  || — || December 14, 2006 || Kitt Peak || Spacewatch || — || align=right data-sort-value="0.59" | 590 m || 
|-id=733 bgcolor=#E9E9E9
| 395733 ||  || — || November 23, 2008 || Catalina || CSS || EUN || align=right | 1.4 km || 
|-id=734 bgcolor=#fefefe
| 395734 ||  || — || November 25, 2005 || Kitt Peak || Spacewatch || NYS || align=right data-sort-value="0.66" | 660 m || 
|-id=735 bgcolor=#fefefe
| 395735 ||  || — || October 6, 2012 || Mount Lemmon || Mount Lemmon Survey || — || align=right | 1.1 km || 
|-id=736 bgcolor=#fefefe
| 395736 ||  || — || December 30, 2005 || Kitt Peak || Spacewatch || — || align=right data-sort-value="0.80" | 800 m || 
|-id=737 bgcolor=#fefefe
| 395737 ||  || — || April 30, 2011 || Mount Lemmon || Mount Lemmon Survey || — || align=right data-sort-value="0.95" | 950 m || 
|-id=738 bgcolor=#fefefe
| 395738 ||  || — || January 31, 2006 || Kitt Peak || Spacewatch || NYS || align=right data-sort-value="0.71" | 710 m || 
|-id=739 bgcolor=#fefefe
| 395739 ||  || — || October 1, 2005 || Mount Lemmon || Mount Lemmon Survey || — || align=right data-sort-value="0.86" | 860 m || 
|-id=740 bgcolor=#fefefe
| 395740 ||  || — || October 12, 2005 || Kitt Peak || Spacewatch || — || align=right data-sort-value="0.73" | 730 m || 
|-id=741 bgcolor=#E9E9E9
| 395741 ||  || — || September 11, 2007 || Mount Lemmon || Mount Lemmon Survey || — || align=right | 3.1 km || 
|-id=742 bgcolor=#fefefe
| 395742 ||  || — || March 18, 2010 || Mount Lemmon || Mount Lemmon Survey || — || align=right data-sort-value="0.76" | 760 m || 
|-id=743 bgcolor=#fefefe
| 395743 ||  || — || October 10, 2008 || Mount Lemmon || Mount Lemmon Survey || V || align=right data-sort-value="0.75" | 750 m || 
|-id=744 bgcolor=#E9E9E9
| 395744 ||  || — || December 18, 2003 || Kitt Peak || Spacewatch || DOR || align=right | 2.5 km || 
|-id=745 bgcolor=#E9E9E9
| 395745 ||  || — || November 10, 2004 || Kitt Peak || Spacewatch || — || align=right data-sort-value="0.96" | 960 m || 
|-id=746 bgcolor=#fefefe
| 395746 ||  || — || October 20, 2008 || Mount Lemmon || Mount Lemmon Survey || — || align=right data-sort-value="0.91" | 910 m || 
|-id=747 bgcolor=#fefefe
| 395747 ||  || — || January 28, 2007 || Mount Lemmon || Mount Lemmon Survey || — || align=right data-sort-value="0.64" | 640 m || 
|-id=748 bgcolor=#E9E9E9
| 395748 ||  || — || December 1, 2003 || Socorro || LINEAR || — || align=right | 2.8 km || 
|-id=749 bgcolor=#fefefe
| 395749 ||  || — || February 16, 2010 || Mount Lemmon || Mount Lemmon Survey || — || align=right data-sort-value="0.90" | 900 m || 
|-id=750 bgcolor=#fefefe
| 395750 ||  || — || December 6, 2005 || Kitt Peak || Spacewatch || — || align=right data-sort-value="0.76" | 760 m || 
|-id=751 bgcolor=#fefefe
| 395751 ||  || — || November 21, 2005 || Kitt Peak || Spacewatch || — || align=right data-sort-value="0.81" | 810 m || 
|-id=752 bgcolor=#E9E9E9
| 395752 ||  || — || February 28, 2009 || Mount Lemmon || Mount Lemmon Survey || — || align=right | 2.0 km || 
|-id=753 bgcolor=#E9E9E9
| 395753 ||  || — || March 8, 2005 || Catalina || CSS || — || align=right | 2.0 km || 
|-id=754 bgcolor=#fefefe
| 395754 ||  || — || October 7, 2005 || Kitt Peak || Spacewatch || — || align=right data-sort-value="0.66" | 660 m || 
|-id=755 bgcolor=#fefefe
| 395755 ||  || — || November 25, 2005 || Kitt Peak || Spacewatch || — || align=right data-sort-value="0.73" | 730 m || 
|-id=756 bgcolor=#E9E9E9
| 395756 ||  || — || October 20, 2008 || Kitt Peak || Spacewatch || (5) || align=right data-sort-value="0.68" | 680 m || 
|-id=757 bgcolor=#fefefe
| 395757 ||  || — || April 22, 2007 || Catalina || CSS || BAP || align=right | 1.4 km || 
|-id=758 bgcolor=#fefefe
| 395758 ||  || — || November 17, 2009 || Mount Lemmon || Mount Lemmon Survey || — || align=right data-sort-value="0.64" | 640 m || 
|-id=759 bgcolor=#E9E9E9
| 395759 ||  || — || January 7, 2005 || Campo Imperatore || CINEOS || (5) || align=right data-sort-value="0.84" | 840 m || 
|-id=760 bgcolor=#fefefe
| 395760 ||  || — || August 21, 2006 || Siding Spring || SSS || H || align=right data-sort-value="0.98" | 980 m || 
|-id=761 bgcolor=#E9E9E9
| 395761 ||  || — || September 3, 2007 || Mount Lemmon || Mount Lemmon Survey || EUN || align=right | 1.5 km || 
|-id=762 bgcolor=#fefefe
| 395762 ||  || — || November 16, 2006 || Mount Lemmon || Mount Lemmon Survey || — || align=right data-sort-value="0.78" | 780 m || 
|-id=763 bgcolor=#fefefe
| 395763 ||  || — || November 23, 2009 || Kitt Peak || Spacewatch || — || align=right data-sort-value="0.68" | 680 m || 
|-id=764 bgcolor=#fefefe
| 395764 ||  || — || August 29, 2005 || Kitt Peak || Spacewatch || — || align=right data-sort-value="0.86" | 860 m || 
|-id=765 bgcolor=#fefefe
| 395765 ||  || — || January 18, 2004 || Kitt Peak || Spacewatch || — || align=right data-sort-value="0.56" | 560 m || 
|-id=766 bgcolor=#fefefe
| 395766 ||  || — || October 6, 2008 || Mount Lemmon || Mount Lemmon Survey || — || align=right data-sort-value="0.99" | 990 m || 
|-id=767 bgcolor=#fefefe
| 395767 ||  || — || September 4, 2008 || Kitt Peak || Spacewatch || — || align=right data-sort-value="0.73" | 730 m || 
|-id=768 bgcolor=#fefefe
| 395768 ||  || — || November 29, 2005 || Kitt Peak || Spacewatch || NYS || align=right data-sort-value="0.63" | 630 m || 
|-id=769 bgcolor=#fefefe
| 395769 ||  || — || October 8, 2012 || Mount Lemmon || Mount Lemmon Survey || — || align=right | 1.0 km || 
|-id=770 bgcolor=#fefefe
| 395770 ||  || — || November 20, 2009 || Mount Lemmon || Mount Lemmon Survey || — || align=right data-sort-value="0.76" | 760 m || 
|-id=771 bgcolor=#fefefe
| 395771 ||  || — || March 19, 2010 || Mount Lemmon || Mount Lemmon Survey || — || align=right data-sort-value="0.82" | 820 m || 
|-id=772 bgcolor=#E9E9E9
| 395772 ||  || — || January 31, 2009 || Mount Lemmon || Mount Lemmon Survey || — || align=right | 1.6 km || 
|-id=773 bgcolor=#fefefe
| 395773 ||  || — || January 28, 2006 || Kitt Peak || Spacewatch || NYS || align=right data-sort-value="0.51" | 510 m || 
|-id=774 bgcolor=#d6d6d6
| 395774 ||  || — || July 7, 2005 || Kitt Peak || Spacewatch || — || align=right | 3.3 km || 
|-id=775 bgcolor=#fefefe
| 395775 ||  || — || January 21, 2002 || Kitt Peak || Spacewatch || — || align=right data-sort-value="0.73" | 730 m || 
|-id=776 bgcolor=#fefefe
| 395776 ||  || — || January 8, 2006 || Mount Lemmon || Mount Lemmon Survey || NYS || align=right data-sort-value="0.61" | 610 m || 
|-id=777 bgcolor=#E9E9E9
| 395777 ||  || — || March 9, 2005 || Catalina || CSS || ADE || align=right | 2.0 km || 
|-id=778 bgcolor=#E9E9E9
| 395778 ||  || — || October 7, 2008 || Mount Lemmon || Mount Lemmon Survey || (5) || align=right | 1.2 km || 
|-id=779 bgcolor=#fefefe
| 395779 ||  || — || December 14, 1999 || Kitt Peak || Spacewatch || — || align=right data-sort-value="0.99" | 990 m || 
|-id=780 bgcolor=#E9E9E9
| 395780 ||  || — || December 7, 1999 || Socorro || LINEAR || — || align=right | 1.6 km || 
|-id=781 bgcolor=#E9E9E9
| 395781 ||  || — || November 14, 2012 || Kitt Peak || Spacewatch || — || align=right data-sort-value="0.94" | 940 m || 
|-id=782 bgcolor=#fefefe
| 395782 ||  || — || September 20, 2001 || Kitt Peak || Spacewatch || NYS || align=right data-sort-value="0.63" | 630 m || 
|-id=783 bgcolor=#E9E9E9
| 395783 ||  || — || October 21, 2003 || Kitt Peak || Spacewatch || — || align=right | 1.8 km || 
|-id=784 bgcolor=#E9E9E9
| 395784 ||  || — || November 5, 1999 || Kitt Peak || Spacewatch || — || align=right | 1.8 km || 
|-id=785 bgcolor=#fefefe
| 395785 ||  || — || December 10, 1998 || Kitt Peak || Spacewatch || — || align=right data-sort-value="0.82" | 820 m || 
|-id=786 bgcolor=#fefefe
| 395786 ||  || — || April 26, 2007 || Kitt Peak || Spacewatch || V || align=right data-sort-value="0.62" | 620 m || 
|-id=787 bgcolor=#E9E9E9
| 395787 ||  || — || April 19, 2006 || Mount Lemmon || Mount Lemmon Survey || — || align=right data-sort-value="0.96" | 960 m || 
|-id=788 bgcolor=#fefefe
| 395788 ||  || — || January 23, 2006 || Kitt Peak || Spacewatch || — || align=right data-sort-value="0.65" | 650 m || 
|-id=789 bgcolor=#fefefe
| 395789 ||  || — || December 18, 2009 || Mount Lemmon || Mount Lemmon Survey || — || align=right data-sort-value="0.73" | 730 m || 
|-id=790 bgcolor=#fefefe
| 395790 ||  || — || November 4, 2008 || Kitt Peak || Spacewatch || — || align=right | 1.9 km || 
|-id=791 bgcolor=#fefefe
| 395791 ||  || — || March 15, 2010 || Mount Lemmon || Mount Lemmon Survey || MAS || align=right data-sort-value="0.57" | 570 m || 
|-id=792 bgcolor=#fefefe
| 395792 ||  || — || November 8, 2008 || Mount Lemmon || Mount Lemmon Survey || — || align=right data-sort-value="0.71" | 710 m || 
|-id=793 bgcolor=#E9E9E9
| 395793 ||  || — || December 9, 2004 || Kitt Peak || Spacewatch || — || align=right data-sort-value="0.89" | 890 m || 
|-id=794 bgcolor=#fefefe
| 395794 ||  || — || August 20, 2008 || Kitt Peak || Spacewatch || — || align=right data-sort-value="0.90" | 900 m || 
|-id=795 bgcolor=#E9E9E9
| 395795 ||  || — || May 7, 2010 || Mount Lemmon || Mount Lemmon Survey || — || align=right | 2.1 km || 
|-id=796 bgcolor=#fefefe
| 395796 ||  || — || November 18, 2009 || Mount Lemmon || Mount Lemmon Survey || — || align=right data-sort-value="0.82" | 820 m || 
|-id=797 bgcolor=#E9E9E9
| 395797 ||  || — || February 14, 2005 || Catalina || CSS || — || align=right | 2.3 km || 
|-id=798 bgcolor=#E9E9E9
| 395798 ||  || — || April 5, 2010 || Kitt Peak || Spacewatch || — || align=right | 2.1 km || 
|-id=799 bgcolor=#fefefe
| 395799 ||  || — || February 2, 2006 || Kitt Peak || Spacewatch || — || align=right data-sort-value="0.99" | 990 m || 
|-id=800 bgcolor=#fefefe
| 395800 ||  || — || January 6, 2010 || Mount Lemmon || Mount Lemmon Survey || — || align=right data-sort-value="0.81" | 810 m || 
|}

395801–395900 

|-bgcolor=#fefefe
| 395801 ||  || — || January 4, 2006 || Kitt Peak || Spacewatch || MAS || align=right data-sort-value="0.65" | 650 m || 
|-id=802 bgcolor=#E9E9E9
| 395802 ||  || — || October 19, 1999 || Kitt Peak || Spacewatch || — || align=right | 1.8 km || 
|-id=803 bgcolor=#fefefe
| 395803 ||  || — || December 12, 1998 || Kitt Peak || Spacewatch || — || align=right data-sort-value="0.80" | 800 m || 
|-id=804 bgcolor=#E9E9E9
| 395804 ||  || — || October 24, 2008 || Mount Lemmon || Mount Lemmon Survey || — || align=right | 1.7 km || 
|-id=805 bgcolor=#fefefe
| 395805 ||  || — || November 20, 2001 || Socorro || LINEAR || — || align=right data-sort-value="0.73" | 730 m || 
|-id=806 bgcolor=#E9E9E9
| 395806 ||  || — || December 2, 2004 || Socorro || LINEAR || — || align=right | 1.6 km || 
|-id=807 bgcolor=#fefefe
| 395807 ||  || — || September 14, 2005 || Catalina || CSS || — || align=right data-sort-value="0.87" | 870 m || 
|-id=808 bgcolor=#fefefe
| 395808 ||  || — || September 30, 2005 || Kitt Peak || Spacewatch || — || align=right data-sort-value="0.66" | 660 m || 
|-id=809 bgcolor=#fefefe
| 395809 ||  || — || December 18, 2009 || Mount Lemmon || Mount Lemmon Survey || — || align=right data-sort-value="0.72" | 720 m || 
|-id=810 bgcolor=#fefefe
| 395810 ||  || — || May 31, 2008 || Mount Lemmon || Mount Lemmon Survey || — || align=right data-sort-value="0.89" | 890 m || 
|-id=811 bgcolor=#fefefe
| 395811 ||  || — || September 23, 2008 || Mount Lemmon || Mount Lemmon Survey || V || align=right data-sort-value="0.71" | 710 m || 
|-id=812 bgcolor=#fefefe
| 395812 ||  || — || November 24, 1997 || Kitt Peak || Spacewatch || — || align=right data-sort-value="0.87" | 870 m || 
|-id=813 bgcolor=#E9E9E9
| 395813 ||  || — || November 18, 2008 || Kitt Peak || Spacewatch || — || align=right | 1.1 km || 
|-id=814 bgcolor=#fefefe
| 395814 ||  || — || December 7, 2005 || Kitt Peak || Spacewatch || — || align=right data-sort-value="0.98" | 980 m || 
|-id=815 bgcolor=#fefefe
| 395815 ||  || — || November 30, 2005 || Kitt Peak || Spacewatch || — || align=right data-sort-value="0.86" | 860 m || 
|-id=816 bgcolor=#E9E9E9
| 395816 ||  || — || April 25, 2006 || Mount Lemmon || Mount Lemmon Survey || — || align=right | 1.1 km || 
|-id=817 bgcolor=#fefefe
| 395817 ||  || — || April 15, 2007 || Catalina || CSS || V || align=right data-sort-value="0.73" | 730 m || 
|-id=818 bgcolor=#E9E9E9
| 395818 ||  || — || October 12, 2007 || Mount Lemmon || Mount Lemmon Survey || — || align=right | 2.1 km || 
|-id=819 bgcolor=#d6d6d6
| 395819 ||  || — || December 3, 2012 || Mount Lemmon || Mount Lemmon Survey || — || align=right | 4.5 km || 
|-id=820 bgcolor=#fefefe
| 395820 ||  || — || October 27, 2005 || Kitt Peak || Spacewatch || — || align=right data-sort-value="0.72" | 720 m || 
|-id=821 bgcolor=#d6d6d6
| 395821 ||  || — || November 5, 2007 || Kitt Peak || Spacewatch || — || align=right | 2.6 km || 
|-id=822 bgcolor=#E9E9E9
| 395822 ||  || — || October 1, 2003 || Anderson Mesa || LONEOS || — || align=right | 1.7 km || 
|-id=823 bgcolor=#fefefe
| 395823 ||  || — || March 12, 2007 || Kitt Peak || Spacewatch || — || align=right data-sort-value="0.81" | 810 m || 
|-id=824 bgcolor=#fefefe
| 395824 ||  || — || February 14, 2010 || Kitt Peak || Spacewatch || — || align=right data-sort-value="0.76" | 760 m || 
|-id=825 bgcolor=#fefefe
| 395825 ||  || — || January 13, 2002 || Socorro || LINEAR || — || align=right | 1.1 km || 
|-id=826 bgcolor=#E9E9E9
| 395826 ||  || — || May 11, 2010 || Mount Lemmon || Mount Lemmon Survey || BRG || align=right | 1.7 km || 
|-id=827 bgcolor=#fefefe
| 395827 ||  || — || December 17, 2009 || Kitt Peak || Spacewatch || — || align=right data-sort-value="0.86" | 860 m || 
|-id=828 bgcolor=#fefefe
| 395828 ||  || — || April 18, 2007 || Kitt Peak || Spacewatch || V || align=right data-sort-value="0.65" | 650 m || 
|-id=829 bgcolor=#E9E9E9
| 395829 ||  || — || October 24, 2008 || Kitt Peak || Spacewatch || — || align=right | 1.2 km || 
|-id=830 bgcolor=#fefefe
| 395830 ||  || — || April 11, 2007 || Kitt Peak || Spacewatch || — || align=right data-sort-value="0.79" | 790 m || 
|-id=831 bgcolor=#fefefe
| 395831 ||  || — || October 2, 2008 || Catalina || CSS || — || align=right | 1.1 km || 
|-id=832 bgcolor=#d6d6d6
| 395832 ||  || — || August 29, 2005 || Kitt Peak || Spacewatch || — || align=right | 3.2 km || 
|-id=833 bgcolor=#fefefe
| 395833 ||  || — || October 7, 2004 || Socorro || LINEAR || — || align=right | 1.0 km || 
|-id=834 bgcolor=#fefefe
| 395834 ||  || — || October 23, 2005 || Catalina || CSS || — || align=right data-sort-value="0.77" | 770 m || 
|-id=835 bgcolor=#E9E9E9
| 395835 ||  || — || November 9, 1999 || Socorro || LINEAR || EUN || align=right | 1.5 km || 
|-id=836 bgcolor=#E9E9E9
| 395836 ||  || — || May 10, 2005 || Kitt Peak || Spacewatch || CLO || align=right | 1.8 km || 
|-id=837 bgcolor=#E9E9E9
| 395837 ||  || — || November 15, 1995 || Kitt Peak || Spacewatch || — || align=right | 1.4 km || 
|-id=838 bgcolor=#E9E9E9
| 395838 ||  || — || December 3, 2008 || Mount Lemmon || Mount Lemmon Survey || — || align=right | 1.3 km || 
|-id=839 bgcolor=#E9E9E9
| 395839 ||  || — || November 30, 2008 || Kitt Peak || Spacewatch || (5) || align=right | 1.00 km || 
|-id=840 bgcolor=#d6d6d6
| 395840 ||  || — || November 18, 2007 || Mount Lemmon || Mount Lemmon Survey || EMA || align=right | 3.6 km || 
|-id=841 bgcolor=#E9E9E9
| 395841 ||  || — || November 30, 2008 || Mount Lemmon || Mount Lemmon Survey || — || align=right | 1.4 km || 
|-id=842 bgcolor=#E9E9E9
| 395842 ||  || — || December 21, 2008 || Catalina || CSS || — || align=right | 2.6 km || 
|-id=843 bgcolor=#E9E9E9
| 395843 ||  || — || December 11, 2004 || Kitt Peak || Spacewatch || — || align=right | 1.1 km || 
|-id=844 bgcolor=#d6d6d6
| 395844 ||  || — || April 2, 2009 || Mount Lemmon || Mount Lemmon Survey || — || align=right | 3.8 km || 
|-id=845 bgcolor=#E9E9E9
| 395845 ||  || — || December 3, 2008 || Mount Lemmon || Mount Lemmon Survey || MAR || align=right | 1.3 km || 
|-id=846 bgcolor=#E9E9E9
| 395846 ||  || — || December 19, 1995 || Kitt Peak || Spacewatch || — || align=right | 2.0 km || 
|-id=847 bgcolor=#fefefe
| 395847 ||  || — || December 21, 2003 || Kitt Peak || Spacewatch || — || align=right data-sort-value="0.73" | 730 m || 
|-id=848 bgcolor=#fefefe
| 395848 ||  || — || January 8, 1999 || Kitt Peak || Spacewatch || — || align=right data-sort-value="0.75" | 750 m || 
|-id=849 bgcolor=#fefefe
| 395849 ||  || — || December 1, 2005 || Kitt Peak || Spacewatch || V || align=right data-sort-value="0.83" | 830 m || 
|-id=850 bgcolor=#fefefe
| 395850 ||  || — || September 11, 2001 || Socorro || LINEAR || — || align=right data-sort-value="0.79" | 790 m || 
|-id=851 bgcolor=#E9E9E9
| 395851 ||  || — || December 30, 2008 || Mount Lemmon || Mount Lemmon Survey || — || align=right | 1.9 km || 
|-id=852 bgcolor=#E9E9E9
| 395852 ||  || — || February 3, 2009 || Mount Lemmon || Mount Lemmon Survey || — || align=right | 1.5 km || 
|-id=853 bgcolor=#fefefe
| 395853 ||  || — || December 31, 2002 || Socorro || LINEAR || — || align=right data-sort-value="0.81" | 810 m || 
|-id=854 bgcolor=#E9E9E9
| 395854 ||  || — || January 13, 2005 || Catalina || CSS || — || align=right | 1.2 km || 
|-id=855 bgcolor=#d6d6d6
| 395855 ||  || — || September 15, 2006 || Kitt Peak || Spacewatch || KOR || align=right | 1.2 km || 
|-id=856 bgcolor=#d6d6d6
| 395856 ||  || — || February 7, 2002 || Kitt Peak || Spacewatch || — || align=right | 2.6 km || 
|-id=857 bgcolor=#E9E9E9
| 395857 ||  || — || December 30, 2008 || Mount Lemmon || Mount Lemmon Survey || — || align=right | 1.0 km || 
|-id=858 bgcolor=#d6d6d6
| 395858 ||  || — || November 11, 2007 || Mount Lemmon || Mount Lemmon Survey || — || align=right | 2.4 km || 
|-id=859 bgcolor=#E9E9E9
| 395859 ||  || — || April 14, 2010 || Mount Lemmon || Mount Lemmon Survey || — || align=right | 1.2 km || 
|-id=860 bgcolor=#E9E9E9
| 395860 ||  || — || November 30, 2008 || Mount Lemmon || Mount Lemmon Survey || (5) || align=right data-sort-value="0.69" | 690 m || 
|-id=861 bgcolor=#E9E9E9
| 395861 ||  || — || September 28, 2003 || Anderson Mesa || LONEOS || (5) || align=right | 1.0 km || 
|-id=862 bgcolor=#d6d6d6
| 395862 ||  || — || September 20, 2011 || Catalina || CSS || — || align=right | 3.2 km || 
|-id=863 bgcolor=#E9E9E9
| 395863 ||  || — || December 2, 2008 || Mount Lemmon || Mount Lemmon Survey || — || align=right | 1.2 km || 
|-id=864 bgcolor=#E9E9E9
| 395864 ||  || — || May 30, 2006 || Mount Lemmon || Mount Lemmon Survey || — || align=right | 1.5 km || 
|-id=865 bgcolor=#d6d6d6
| 395865 ||  || — || March 25, 2003 || Kitt Peak || Spacewatch || — || align=right | 2.6 km || 
|-id=866 bgcolor=#E9E9E9
| 395866 ||  || — || September 10, 2007 || Kitt Peak || Spacewatch || — || align=right | 1.3 km || 
|-id=867 bgcolor=#E9E9E9
| 395867 ||  || — || September 9, 2007 || Kitt Peak || Spacewatch || — || align=right | 1.3 km || 
|-id=868 bgcolor=#d6d6d6
| 395868 ||  || — || June 14, 2009 || Mount Lemmon || Mount Lemmon Survey || — || align=right | 3.3 km || 
|-id=869 bgcolor=#E9E9E9
| 395869 ||  || — || October 11, 2007 || Catalina || CSS || — || align=right | 1.7 km || 
|-id=870 bgcolor=#E9E9E9
| 395870 ||  || — || May 18, 2005 || Siding Spring || SSS || — || align=right | 2.0 km || 
|-id=871 bgcolor=#E9E9E9
| 395871 ||  || — || October 20, 2007 || Mount Lemmon || Mount Lemmon Survey || — || align=right | 1.6 km || 
|-id=872 bgcolor=#E9E9E9
| 395872 ||  || — || June 8, 1997 || Kitt Peak || Spacewatch || HNS || align=right | 1.3 km || 
|-id=873 bgcolor=#d6d6d6
| 395873 ||  || — || December 6, 2007 || Mount Lemmon || Mount Lemmon Survey || — || align=right | 3.0 km || 
|-id=874 bgcolor=#fefefe
| 395874 ||  || — || December 24, 2005 || Kitt Peak || Spacewatch || — || align=right data-sort-value="0.80" | 800 m || 
|-id=875 bgcolor=#E9E9E9
| 395875 ||  || — || November 24, 2003 || Kitt Peak || Spacewatch || EUN || align=right | 1.3 km || 
|-id=876 bgcolor=#d6d6d6
| 395876 ||  || — || November 20, 2000 || Kitt Peak || Spacewatch || VER || align=right | 3.1 km || 
|-id=877 bgcolor=#fefefe
| 395877 ||  || — || October 30, 2005 || Kitt Peak || Spacewatch || V || align=right data-sort-value="0.72" | 720 m || 
|-id=878 bgcolor=#E9E9E9
| 395878 ||  || — || April 2, 2006 || Kitt Peak || Spacewatch || — || align=right | 1.00 km || 
|-id=879 bgcolor=#d6d6d6
| 395879 ||  || — || April 22, 2009 || Mount Lemmon || Mount Lemmon Survey || — || align=right | 5.5 km || 
|-id=880 bgcolor=#E9E9E9
| 395880 ||  || — || August 28, 2006 || Kitt Peak || Spacewatch || AGN || align=right | 1.2 km || 
|-id=881 bgcolor=#d6d6d6
| 395881 ||  || — || November 19, 2006 || Kitt Peak || Spacewatch || — || align=right | 2.6 km || 
|-id=882 bgcolor=#fefefe
| 395882 ||  || — || October 29, 2000 || Kitt Peak || Spacewatch || — || align=right data-sort-value="0.89" | 890 m || 
|-id=883 bgcolor=#d6d6d6
| 395883 ||  || — || February 11, 2008 || Mount Lemmon || Mount Lemmon Survey || — || align=right | 3.1 km || 
|-id=884 bgcolor=#d6d6d6
| 395884 ||  || — || March 5, 2008 || Mount Lemmon || Mount Lemmon Survey || EMA || align=right | 2.9 km || 
|-id=885 bgcolor=#E9E9E9
| 395885 ||  || — || February 20, 2009 || Kitt Peak || Spacewatch || HOF || align=right | 2.3 km || 
|-id=886 bgcolor=#E9E9E9
| 395886 ||  || — || September 17, 2003 || Kitt Peak || Spacewatch || — || align=right | 1.3 km || 
|-id=887 bgcolor=#d6d6d6
| 395887 ||  || — || February 13, 2008 || Kitt Peak || Spacewatch || — || align=right | 2.4 km || 
|-id=888 bgcolor=#E9E9E9
| 395888 ||  || — || December 5, 2002 || Socorro || LINEAR || — || align=right | 2.9 km || 
|-id=889 bgcolor=#d6d6d6
| 395889 ||  || — || October 3, 2006 || Mount Lemmon || Mount Lemmon Survey || — || align=right | 2.2 km || 
|-id=890 bgcolor=#E9E9E9
| 395890 ||  || — || March 1, 2009 || Kitt Peak || Spacewatch || — || align=right | 2.1 km || 
|-id=891 bgcolor=#E9E9E9
| 395891 ||  || — || August 29, 2006 || Kitt Peak || Spacewatch || AGN || align=right | 1.6 km || 
|-id=892 bgcolor=#d6d6d6
| 395892 ||  || — || March 11, 2008 || Catalina || CSS || — || align=right | 3.7 km || 
|-id=893 bgcolor=#E9E9E9
| 395893 ||  || — || September 28, 2006 || Kitt Peak || Spacewatch || — || align=right | 2.5 km || 
|-id=894 bgcolor=#d6d6d6
| 395894 ||  || — || November 20, 2006 || Mount Lemmon || Mount Lemmon Survey || — || align=right | 2.6 km || 
|-id=895 bgcolor=#d6d6d6
| 395895 ||  || — || December 19, 2007 || Mount Lemmon || Mount Lemmon Survey || — || align=right | 3.0 km || 
|-id=896 bgcolor=#d6d6d6
| 395896 ||  || — || November 17, 2006 || Mount Lemmon || Mount Lemmon Survey || EOS || align=right | 1.9 km || 
|-id=897 bgcolor=#E9E9E9
| 395897 ||  || — || September 14, 2007 || Catalina || CSS || — || align=right | 1.3 km || 
|-id=898 bgcolor=#d6d6d6
| 395898 ||  || — || December 18, 2001 || Socorro || LINEAR || — || align=right | 3.1 km || 
|-id=899 bgcolor=#E9E9E9
| 395899 ||  || — || March 24, 2009 || Mount Lemmon || Mount Lemmon Survey || MRX || align=right data-sort-value="0.90" | 900 m || 
|-id=900 bgcolor=#d6d6d6
| 395900 ||  || — || January 1, 2008 || Mount Lemmon || Mount Lemmon Survey || — || align=right | 3.3 km || 
|}

395901–396000 

|-bgcolor=#E9E9E9
| 395901 ||  || — || December 18, 2003 || Socorro || LINEAR || — || align=right | 1.7 km || 
|-id=902 bgcolor=#d6d6d6
| 395902 ||  || — || May 4, 2009 || Mount Lemmon || Mount Lemmon Survey || — || align=right | 2.8 km || 
|-id=903 bgcolor=#E9E9E9
| 395903 ||  || — || May 9, 2005 || Mount Lemmon || Mount Lemmon Survey || — || align=right | 1.6 km || 
|-id=904 bgcolor=#E9E9E9
| 395904 ||  || — || January 29, 2009 || Mount Lemmon || Mount Lemmon Survey || — || align=right | 1.4 km || 
|-id=905 bgcolor=#fefefe
| 395905 ||  || — || October 20, 2012 || Mount Lemmon || Mount Lemmon Survey || — || align=right | 1.4 km || 
|-id=906 bgcolor=#E9E9E9
| 395906 ||  || — || November 2, 2007 || Kitt Peak || Spacewatch || — || align=right | 2.3 km || 
|-id=907 bgcolor=#d6d6d6
| 395907 ||  || — || September 27, 2011 || Mount Lemmon || Mount Lemmon Survey || 615 || align=right | 1.6 km || 
|-id=908 bgcolor=#E9E9E9
| 395908 ||  || — || October 22, 2003 || Kitt Peak || Spacewatch || — || align=right | 1.0 km || 
|-id=909 bgcolor=#E9E9E9
| 395909 ||  || — || November 18, 2003 || Kitt Peak || Spacewatch || — || align=right | 1.7 km || 
|-id=910 bgcolor=#d6d6d6
| 395910 ||  || — || July 1, 2011 || Mount Lemmon || Mount Lemmon Survey || — || align=right | 2.7 km || 
|-id=911 bgcolor=#E9E9E9
| 395911 ||  || — || October 20, 2007 || Mount Lemmon || Mount Lemmon Survey || AGN || align=right | 1.3 km || 
|-id=912 bgcolor=#d6d6d6
| 395912 ||  || — || September 27, 2006 || Kitt Peak || Spacewatch || — || align=right | 2.2 km || 
|-id=913 bgcolor=#E9E9E9
| 395913 ||  || — || October 12, 2007 || Mount Lemmon || Mount Lemmon Survey || — || align=right | 1.7 km || 
|-id=914 bgcolor=#E9E9E9
| 395914 ||  || — || February 9, 2005 || Kitt Peak || Spacewatch || — || align=right | 1.2 km || 
|-id=915 bgcolor=#E9E9E9
| 395915 ||  || — || March 14, 2004 || Kitt Peak || Spacewatch || AGN || align=right | 1.4 km || 
|-id=916 bgcolor=#E9E9E9
| 395916 ||  || — || December 19, 2003 || Kitt Peak || Spacewatch || — || align=right | 2.8 km || 
|-id=917 bgcolor=#d6d6d6
| 395917 ||  || — || June 3, 2005 || Kitt Peak || Spacewatch || — || align=right | 3.4 km || 
|-id=918 bgcolor=#E9E9E9
| 395918 ||  || — || April 11, 2005 || Kitt Peak || Spacewatch || — || align=right | 2.5 km || 
|-id=919 bgcolor=#d6d6d6
| 395919 ||  || — || November 7, 2007 || Mount Lemmon || Mount Lemmon Survey || — || align=right | 2.7 km || 
|-id=920 bgcolor=#E9E9E9
| 395920 ||  || — || September 10, 2007 || Mount Lemmon || Mount Lemmon Survey || — || align=right | 2.5 km || 
|-id=921 bgcolor=#fefefe
| 395921 ||  || — || November 4, 2004 || Kitt Peak || Spacewatch || — || align=right | 1.1 km || 
|-id=922 bgcolor=#d6d6d6
| 395922 ||  || — || October 19, 2006 || Mount Lemmon || Mount Lemmon Survey || — || align=right | 2.6 km || 
|-id=923 bgcolor=#d6d6d6
| 395923 ||  || — || December 19, 2007 || Mount Lemmon || Mount Lemmon Survey || EOS || align=right | 2.0 km || 
|-id=924 bgcolor=#fefefe
| 395924 ||  || — || November 8, 2008 || Mount Lemmon || Mount Lemmon Survey || — || align=right | 1.1 km || 
|-id=925 bgcolor=#d6d6d6
| 395925 ||  || — || March 4, 2008 || Mount Lemmon || Mount Lemmon Survey || EOS || align=right | 2.2 km || 
|-id=926 bgcolor=#d6d6d6
| 395926 ||  || — || December 18, 2001 || Socorro || LINEAR || — || align=right | 3.5 km || 
|-id=927 bgcolor=#E9E9E9
| 395927 ||  || — || January 25, 2009 || Kitt Peak || Spacewatch || — || align=right | 1.4 km || 
|-id=928 bgcolor=#fefefe
| 395928 ||  || — || February 3, 2006 || Socorro || LINEAR || — || align=right | 2.9 km || 
|-id=929 bgcolor=#E9E9E9
| 395929 ||  || — || October 20, 2003 || Kitt Peak || Spacewatch || — || align=right | 1.5 km || 
|-id=930 bgcolor=#fefefe
| 395930 ||  || — || October 9, 1996 || Kitt Peak || Spacewatch || V || align=right data-sort-value="0.74" | 740 m || 
|-id=931 bgcolor=#E9E9E9
| 395931 ||  || — || February 11, 2004 || Kitt Peak || Spacewatch || — || align=right | 2.3 km || 
|-id=932 bgcolor=#E9E9E9
| 395932 ||  || — || November 19, 2007 || Kitt Peak || Spacewatch ||  || align=right | 1.5 km || 
|-id=933 bgcolor=#E9E9E9
| 395933 ||  || — || February 28, 2009 || Kitt Peak || Spacewatch || PAD || align=right | 1.6 km || 
|-id=934 bgcolor=#E9E9E9
| 395934 ||  || — || November 3, 2007 || Mount Lemmon || Mount Lemmon Survey || — || align=right | 2.4 km || 
|-id=935 bgcolor=#fefefe
| 395935 ||  || — || November 20, 2000 || Socorro || LINEAR || — || align=right | 1.3 km || 
|-id=936 bgcolor=#E9E9E9
| 395936 ||  || — || August 29, 2006 || Kitt Peak || Spacewatch || AGN || align=right | 1.2 km || 
|-id=937 bgcolor=#d6d6d6
| 395937 ||  || — || January 19, 2008 || Mount Lemmon || Mount Lemmon Survey || — || align=right | 3.5 km || 
|-id=938 bgcolor=#E9E9E9
| 395938 ||  || — || March 2, 2009 || Kitt Peak || Spacewatch || HOF || align=right | 2.9 km || 
|-id=939 bgcolor=#E9E9E9
| 395939 ||  || — || September 18, 1995 || Kitt Peak || Spacewatch || (5) || align=right data-sort-value="0.90" | 900 m || 
|-id=940 bgcolor=#fefefe
| 395940 ||  || — || December 16, 2004 || Kitt Peak || Spacewatch || — || align=right | 1.1 km || 
|-id=941 bgcolor=#E9E9E9
| 395941 ||  || — || November 18, 2007 || Mount Lemmon || Mount Lemmon Survey || — || align=right | 2.7 km || 
|-id=942 bgcolor=#E9E9E9
| 395942 ||  || — || January 16, 2004 || Kitt Peak || Spacewatch || — || align=right | 1.8 km || 
|-id=943 bgcolor=#fefefe
| 395943 ||  || — || December 15, 2004 || Socorro || LINEAR || NYS || align=right data-sort-value="0.82" | 820 m || 
|-id=944 bgcolor=#d6d6d6
| 395944 ||  || — || December 3, 2007 || Kitt Peak || Spacewatch || — || align=right | 3.5 km || 
|-id=945 bgcolor=#E9E9E9
| 395945 ||  || — || November 23, 2003 || Anderson Mesa || LONEOS || — || align=right | 2.2 km || 
|-id=946 bgcolor=#d6d6d6
| 395946 ||  || — || December 18, 2007 || Kitt Peak || Spacewatch || — || align=right | 2.2 km || 
|-id=947 bgcolor=#fefefe
| 395947 ||  || — || January 9, 2006 || Kitt Peak || Spacewatch || — || align=right data-sort-value="0.87" | 870 m || 
|-id=948 bgcolor=#E9E9E9
| 395948 ||  || — || August 28, 2006 || Kitt Peak || Spacewatch || AGN || align=right | 1.5 km || 
|-id=949 bgcolor=#d6d6d6
| 395949 ||  || — || October 22, 2011 || Kitt Peak || Spacewatch || — || align=right | 3.8 km || 
|-id=950 bgcolor=#d6d6d6
| 395950 ||  || — || February 24, 2008 || Mount Lemmon || Mount Lemmon Survey || — || align=right | 2.9 km || 
|-id=951 bgcolor=#d6d6d6
| 395951 ||  || — || April 12, 2004 || Kitt Peak || Spacewatch || — || align=right | 2.2 km || 
|-id=952 bgcolor=#fefefe
| 395952 ||  || — || November 30, 2008 || Mount Lemmon || Mount Lemmon Survey || V || align=right data-sort-value="0.84" | 840 m || 
|-id=953 bgcolor=#E9E9E9
| 395953 ||  || — || February 4, 2000 || Kitt Peak || Spacewatch || — || align=right | 1.7 km || 
|-id=954 bgcolor=#d6d6d6
| 395954 ||  || — || September 2, 2010 || Mount Lemmon || Mount Lemmon Survey || — || align=right | 3.2 km || 
|-id=955 bgcolor=#d6d6d6
| 395955 ||  || — || February 28, 2008 || Mount Lemmon || Mount Lemmon Survey || — || align=right | 2.8 km || 
|-id=956 bgcolor=#d6d6d6
| 395956 ||  || — || April 29, 2008 || Mount Lemmon || Mount Lemmon Survey || 7:4 || align=right | 2.6 km || 
|-id=957 bgcolor=#d6d6d6
| 395957 ||  || — || November 17, 2006 || Mount Lemmon || Mount Lemmon Survey || — || align=right | 2.7 km || 
|-id=958 bgcolor=#d6d6d6
| 395958 ||  || — || April 13, 2004 || Kitt Peak || Spacewatch || — || align=right | 2.7 km || 
|-id=959 bgcolor=#d6d6d6
| 395959 ||  || — || November 23, 2006 || Mount Lemmon || Mount Lemmon Survey || — || align=right | 2.3 km || 
|-id=960 bgcolor=#d6d6d6
| 395960 ||  || — || April 5, 2003 || Kitt Peak || Spacewatch || — || align=right | 2.4 km || 
|-id=961 bgcolor=#d6d6d6
| 395961 ||  || — || September 23, 2011 || Kitt Peak || Spacewatch || — || align=right | 2.9 km || 
|-id=962 bgcolor=#d6d6d6
| 395962 ||  || — || October 3, 2006 || Mount Lemmon || Mount Lemmon Survey || EOS || align=right | 1.3 km || 
|-id=963 bgcolor=#E9E9E9
| 395963 ||  || — || November 4, 1999 || Kitt Peak || Spacewatch || — || align=right | 1.1 km || 
|-id=964 bgcolor=#d6d6d6
| 395964 ||  || — || March 24, 2009 || Mount Lemmon || Mount Lemmon Survey || BRA || align=right | 1.6 km || 
|-id=965 bgcolor=#d6d6d6
| 395965 ||  || — || September 5, 2010 || Mount Lemmon || Mount Lemmon Survey || — || align=right | 3.3 km || 
|-id=966 bgcolor=#E9E9E9
| 395966 ||  || — || November 1, 2007 || Kitt Peak || Spacewatch || — || align=right | 2.0 km || 
|-id=967 bgcolor=#d6d6d6
| 395967 ||  || — || February 8, 2008 || Kitt Peak || Spacewatch || — || align=right | 3.2 km || 
|-id=968 bgcolor=#d6d6d6
| 395968 ||  || — || March 1, 2008 || Kitt Peak || Spacewatch || — || align=right | 2.9 km || 
|-id=969 bgcolor=#E9E9E9
| 395969 ||  || — || March 29, 2000 || Kitt Peak || Spacewatch || — || align=right | 2.5 km || 
|-id=970 bgcolor=#E9E9E9
| 395970 ||  || — || January 16, 2004 || Kitt Peak || Spacewatch || — || align=right | 2.1 km || 
|-id=971 bgcolor=#E9E9E9
| 395971 ||  || — || February 20, 2009 || Kitt Peak || Spacewatch || — || align=right | 2.0 km || 
|-id=972 bgcolor=#E9E9E9
| 395972 ||  || — || August 29, 2006 || Kitt Peak || Spacewatch || AGN || align=right | 1.2 km || 
|-id=973 bgcolor=#E9E9E9
| 395973 ||  || — || February 26, 2009 || Kitt Peak || Spacewatch || — || align=right | 1.8 km || 
|-id=974 bgcolor=#fefefe
| 395974 ||  || — || November 17, 2004 || Campo Imperatore || CINEOS || — || align=right data-sort-value="0.98" | 980 m || 
|-id=975 bgcolor=#d6d6d6
| 395975 ||  || — || November 17, 2006 || Mount Lemmon || Mount Lemmon Survey || — || align=right | 2.8 km || 
|-id=976 bgcolor=#E9E9E9
| 395976 ||  || — || October 30, 2007 || Kitt Peak || Spacewatch || — || align=right | 1.0 km || 
|-id=977 bgcolor=#E9E9E9
| 395977 ||  || — || December 16, 2007 || Kitt Peak || Spacewatch || — || align=right | 4.3 km || 
|-id=978 bgcolor=#d6d6d6
| 395978 ||  || — || March 2, 2009 || Mount Lemmon || Mount Lemmon Survey || — || align=right | 3.1 km || 
|-id=979 bgcolor=#E9E9E9
| 395979 ||  || — || September 20, 2011 || Mount Lemmon || Mount Lemmon Survey || — || align=right | 1.1 km || 
|-id=980 bgcolor=#E9E9E9
| 395980 ||  || — || September 18, 2003 || Kitt Peak || Spacewatch || — || align=right data-sort-value="0.97" | 970 m || 
|-id=981 bgcolor=#d6d6d6
| 395981 ||  || — || February 10, 2002 || Socorro || LINEAR || — || align=right | 3.3 km || 
|-id=982 bgcolor=#E9E9E9
| 395982 ||  || — || February 28, 2009 || Kitt Peak || Spacewatch || WIT || align=right data-sort-value="0.83" | 830 m || 
|-id=983 bgcolor=#d6d6d6
| 395983 ||  || — || May 1, 2009 || Mount Lemmon || Mount Lemmon Survey || — || align=right | 3.5 km || 
|-id=984 bgcolor=#E9E9E9
| 395984 ||  || — || November 3, 2007 || Kitt Peak || Spacewatch || — || align=right | 1.6 km || 
|-id=985 bgcolor=#E9E9E9
| 395985 ||  || — || April 17, 2005 || Kitt Peak || Spacewatch || — || align=right | 1.9 km || 
|-id=986 bgcolor=#d6d6d6
| 395986 ||  || — || September 13, 2005 || Kitt Peak || Spacewatch || — || align=right | 2.8 km || 
|-id=987 bgcolor=#E9E9E9
| 395987 ||  || — || January 17, 2009 || Kitt Peak || Spacewatch || — || align=right | 3.1 km || 
|-id=988 bgcolor=#d6d6d6
| 395988 ||  || — || April 14, 2008 || Kitt Peak || Spacewatch || — || align=right | 3.7 km || 
|-id=989 bgcolor=#E9E9E9
| 395989 ||  || — || October 10, 2007 || Kitt Peak || Spacewatch || — || align=right | 1.5 km || 
|-id=990 bgcolor=#E9E9E9
| 395990 ||  || — || November 5, 2007 || Kitt Peak || Spacewatch || NEM || align=right | 2.3 km || 
|-id=991 bgcolor=#d6d6d6
| 395991 ||  || — || January 30, 2008 || Catalina || CSS || EOS || align=right | 2.7 km || 
|-id=992 bgcolor=#d6d6d6
| 395992 ||  || — || March 4, 2008 || Kitt Peak || Spacewatch || — || align=right | 3.1 km || 
|-id=993 bgcolor=#E9E9E9
| 395993 ||  || — || January 28, 2004 || Kitt Peak || Spacewatch || — || align=right | 2.5 km || 
|-id=994 bgcolor=#d6d6d6
| 395994 ||  || — || April 10, 2003 || Kitt Peak || Spacewatch || — || align=right | 3.0 km || 
|-id=995 bgcolor=#d6d6d6
| 395995 ||  || — || January 21, 2002 || Kitt Peak || Spacewatch || — || align=right | 3.3 km || 
|-id=996 bgcolor=#fefefe
| 395996 ||  || — || April 8, 2010 || Mount Lemmon || Mount Lemmon Survey || — || align=right | 2.2 km || 
|-id=997 bgcolor=#E9E9E9
| 395997 ||  || — || December 30, 2008 || Mount Lemmon || Mount Lemmon Survey || — || align=right | 2.7 km || 
|-id=998 bgcolor=#E9E9E9
| 395998 ||  || — || September 15, 2007 || Mount Lemmon || Mount Lemmon Survey || — || align=right | 1.9 km || 
|-id=999 bgcolor=#fefefe
| 395999 ||  || — || October 1, 2000 || Anderson Mesa || LONEOS || NYS || align=right data-sort-value="0.81" | 810 m || 
|-id=000 bgcolor=#d6d6d6
| 396000 ||  || — || December 1, 2006 || Mount Lemmon || Mount Lemmon Survey || 7:4 || align=right | 3.4 km || 
|}

References

External links 
 Discovery Circumstances: Numbered Minor Planets (395001)–(400000) (IAU Minor Planet Center)

0395